= Teotihuacan =

Ancient Mesoamerican city

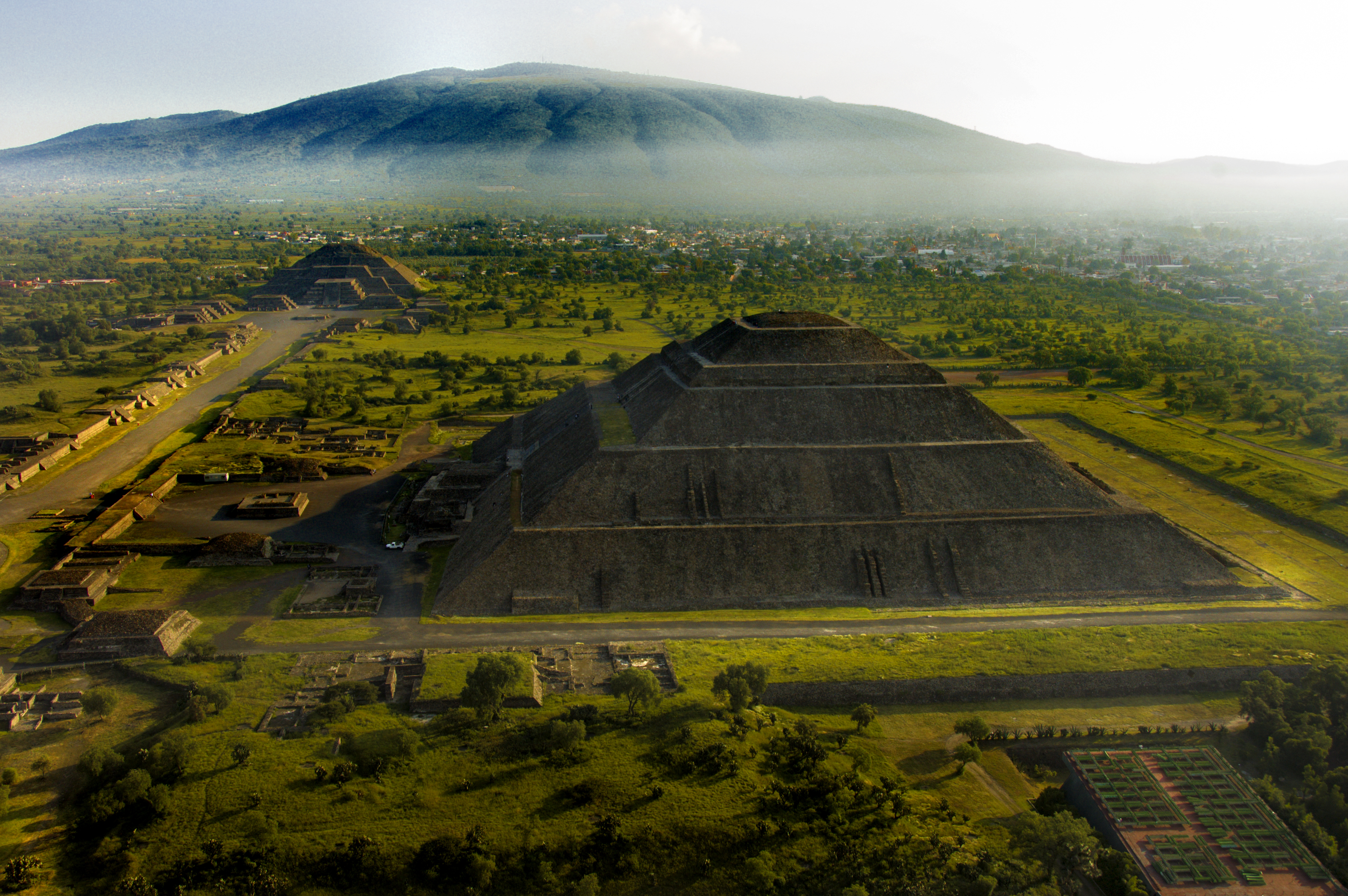
- Aerial view of the city, featuring the Pyramid of the Sun, the Pyramid of the Moon (background), and the Avenue of the Dead.

- Location of the site Teotihuacan (State of Mexico)
- 19°41′33″N 98°50′38″W
- Periods: Late Preclassic to late Classic
- Location: Teotihuacán, State of Mexico, Mexico

History
- Built: 100 BCE - 250 CE
- Abandoned: 750 CE

Site notes
- Architectural style: Talud-tablero

UNESCO World Heritage Site
- Official name: Pre-Hispanic City of Teotihuacan
- Criteria: Cultural: i, ii, iii, iv, vi
- Reference: 414
- Inscription: 1987 (11th Session)
- Area: 3,381.71 ha (8,356.4 acres)

Teotihuacan (/teɪˌoʊtiːwəˈkɑːn/; Spanish: Teotihuacán, Spanish pronunciation: [teotiwaˈkan]; Classical Nahuatl: Teōtīhuacān, Classical Nahuatl pronunciation: [te.oːtiːˈwakaːn]) is an ancient Mesoamerican city located in a sub-valley of the Valley of Mexico, which is located in the State of Mexico, 40 kilometers (25 mi) northeast of modern-day Mexico City.

Teotihuacan is known today as the site of many of the most architecturally significant Mesoamerican pyramids built in the pre-Columbian Americas, namely the Pyramid of the Sun and the Pyramid of the Moon. Although close to Mexico City, Teotihuacan was not a Mexica (i.e. Aztec) city, and it predates the Aztec Empire by many centuries. At its zenith, perhaps in the first half of the first millennium (1 CE to 500 CE), Teotihuacan was the largest city in the Americas. Its population has been estimated to be at least 25,000, but likely sat around 100,000 during its height, potentially making it the sixth-largest city in the world during its epoch.

The city covered twenty-one square kilometres (8 sq mi) and 80 to 90 percent of the total population of the valley resided in Teotihuacan. Apart from the pyramids, Teotihuacan is also anthropologically significant for its complex, multi-family residential compounds, the Avenue of the Dead, and its vibrant, well-preserved murals. Additionally, Teotihuacan exported fine obsidian tools found throughout Mesoamerica. The city is thought to have been established around 100 BCE, with major monuments continuously under construction until about 250 CE. The city may have lasted until sometime between the 7th and 8th centuries CE, but its major monuments were sacked and systematically burned around 550 CE. Its collapse might be related to the extreme weather events of 535–536.

Teotihuacan began as a religious center in the Mexican Plateau around the first century CE. It became the largest and most populated center in the pre-Columbian Americas. Teotihuacan was home to multi-floor apartment compounds built to accommodate the large population. The term Teotihuacan (or Teotihuacano) is also used to refer to the whole civilization and cultural complex associated with the site. Although it is a subject of debate whether Teotihuacan was the center of a state empire, its influence throughout Mesoamerica is well documented. Evidence of Teotihuacano presence is found at numerous sites in Veracruz and the Maya region. The later Aztecs saw these magnificent ruins and claimed a common ancestry with the Teotihuacanos, modifying and adopting aspects of their culture.

The ethnicity of the inhabitants of Teotihuacan is the subject of debate. Possible candidates are the Nahuas, Otomi, or Totonac. Other scholars have suggested that Teotihuacan was multi-ethnic, due to the discovery of cultural aspects connected to the Maya as well as Oto-Pamean people. It is clear that many different cultural groups lived in Teotihuacan during the height of its power, with migrants coming from all over, but especially from Oaxaca and the Gulf Coast. After the collapse of Teotihuacan, central Mexico was dominated by more regional powers, notably Xochicalco and Tula.

The city and the archeological site are located in what is now the San Juan Teotihuacán municipality in the State of México, approximately 40 kilometers (25 mi) northeast of Mexico City. The site covers a total surface area of 83 square kilometers (32 sq mi) and was designated a UNESCO World Heritage Site in 1987. It was the second most-visited archeological site in Mexico in 2024, receiving 1,313,321 visitors.

== Etymology ==
Location in Greater Mexico City

The name Teōtīhuacān was given by the Nahuatl-speaking Aztecs centuries after the fall of the city around 550 CE. The term has been glossed as "birthplace of the gods", or "place where gods were born", reflecting Nahua creation myths that were said to occur in Teotihuacan. Nahuatl scholar Thelma D. Sullivan interprets the name as "place of those who have the road of the gods." This is because the Aztecs believed that the gods created the universe at that site. The name is pronounced [te.oːtiːˈwakaːn] in Nahuatl, with the stress on the syllable wa. By normal Nahuatl orthographic conventions, a written accent mark would not appear in that position. Both this pronunciation and the Spanish pronunciation [te.otiwaˈkan] are used; in Spanish the stress falls on the second to last vowel, as long as the last letter in the word is a vowel, an n, or an s, so again an accent mark is not used.

The original name of the city is unknown, but it appears in hieroglyphic texts from the Maya region as puh, or "Place of Reeds". This suggests that, in the Maya civilization of the Classic period, Teotihuacan was understood as a Place of Reeds similar to other Postclassic Central Mexican settlements that took the name of Tollan, such as Tula-Hidalgo and Cholula.

This naming convention led to much confusion in the early 20th century, as scholars debated whether Teotihuacan or Tula-Hidalgo was the Tollan described by 16th-century chronicles. It now seems clear that Tollan may be understood as a generic Nahua term applied to any large settlement. In the Mesoamerican concept of urbanism, Tollan and other language equivalents serve as a metaphor, linking the bundles of reeds and rushes that formed part of the lacustrine environment of the Valley of Mexico and the large gathering of people in a city.

As of January 23, 2018, the name Teotihuacan has come under scrutiny by experts, who now feel that the site's name may have been changed by Spanish colonizers in the 16th century. Archeologist Verónica Ortega of the National Institute of Anthropology and History states that the city appears to have actually been named Teohuacan, meaning "City of the Sun" rather than "City of the Gods", as the current name suggests.

== History ==
=== Historical course ===
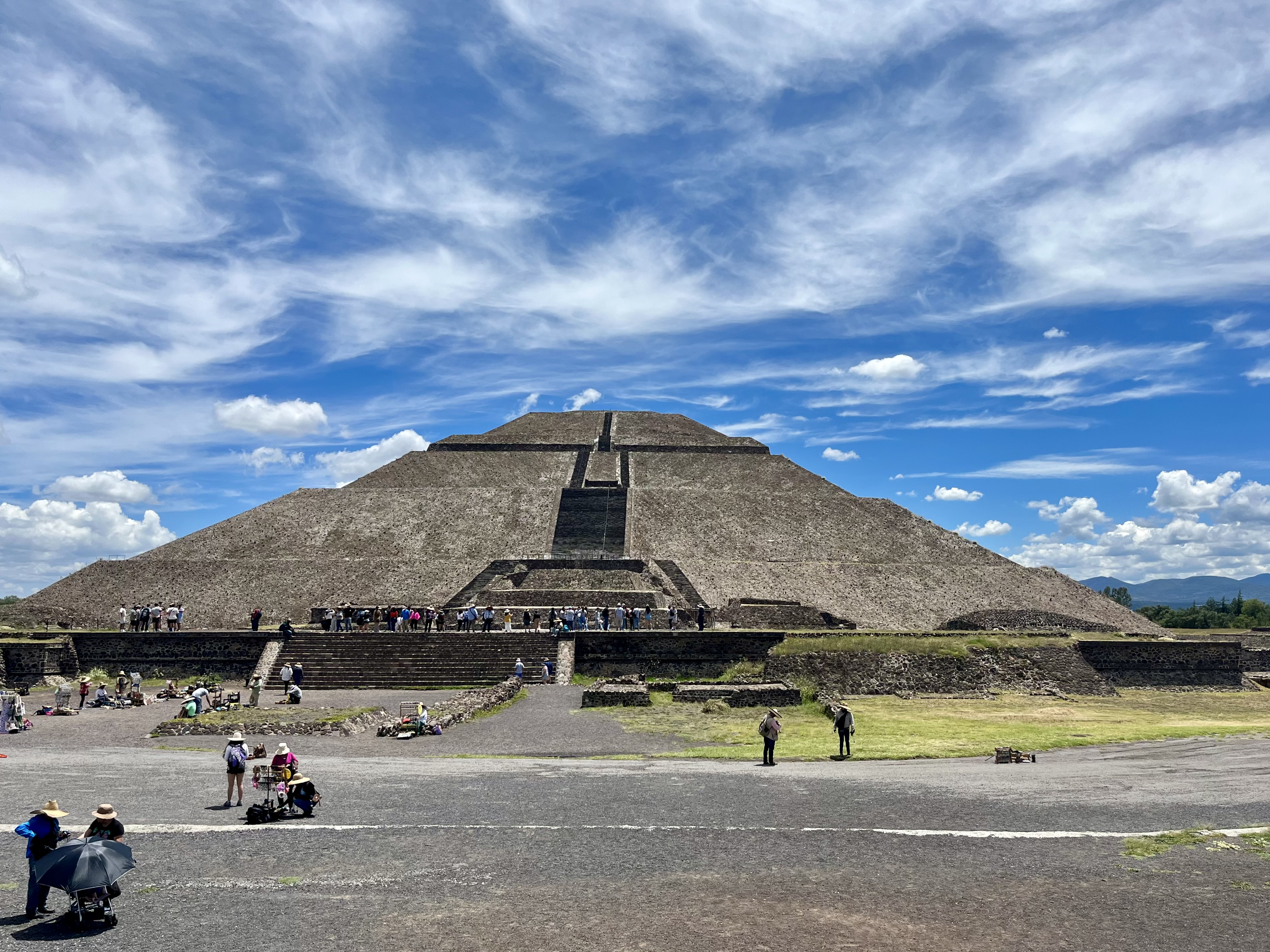
Front view of the Pyramid of the Sun

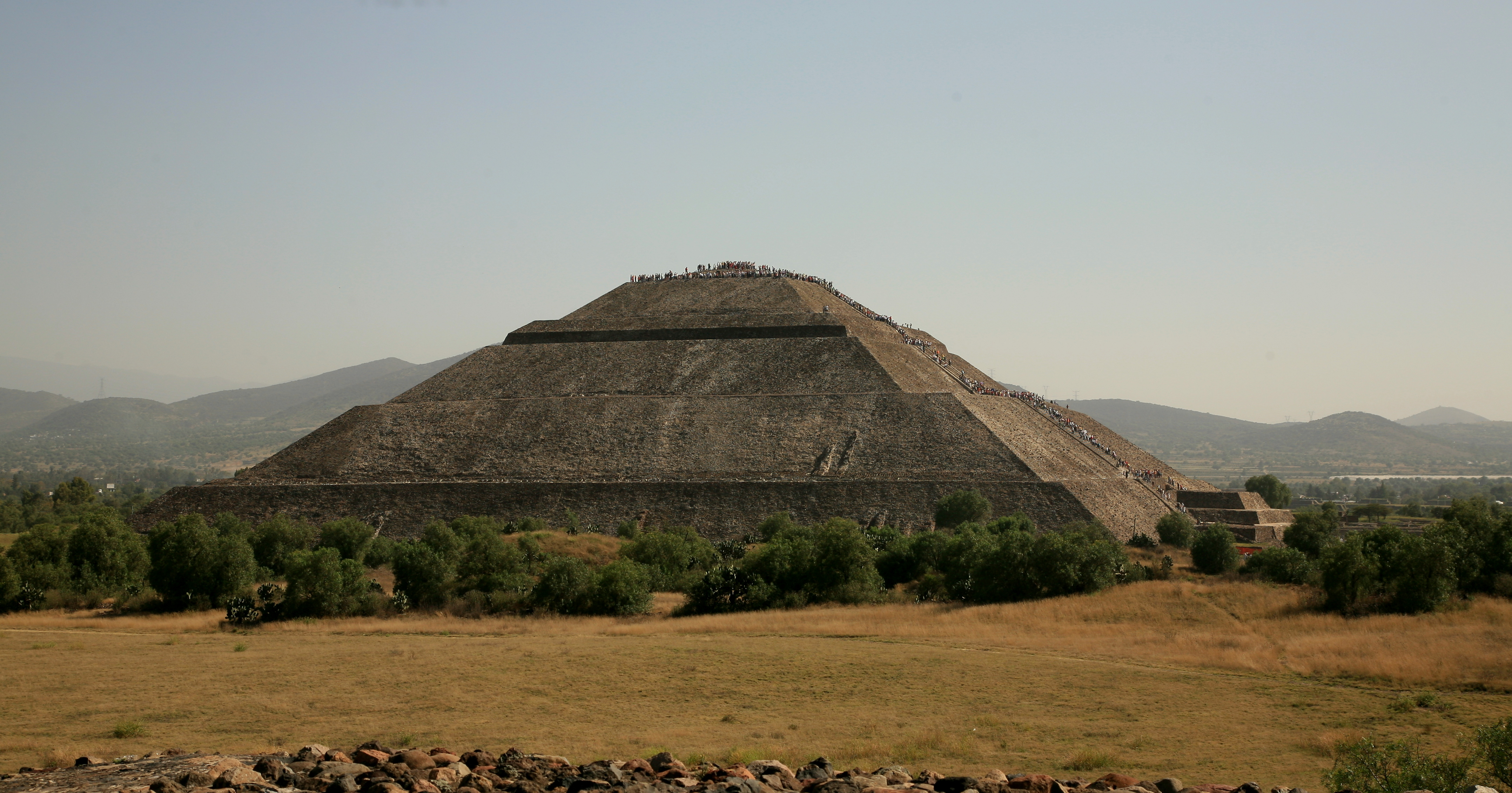
Left side view of the Pyramid of the Sun

The first human establishment in the Teotihuacan area dates back to 600 BCE, and until 200 BCE the site consisted of scattered small villages. The total estimated population of the Teotihuacan Valley during this time was approximately 6,000. From 100 BCE to 750 CE, Teotihuacan evolved into a huge urban and administrative center with cultural influences throughout the broader Mesoamerica region.

The history of Teotihuacan is distinguished by four consecutive periods:

Period I occurred between 200 – 1 BCE and marks the development of a distinctively urban area. During this period, Teotihuacan began to grow into a city as local farmers began coalescing around the abundant springs of Teotihuacan.

Period II lasted between 1 CE to 350 CE. During this era, Teotihuacan exhibited explosive growth and emerged as the largest metropolis in Mesoamerica. Factors influencing this growth include the destruction of other settlements due to volcanic eruptions and the economic pull of the expanding city. This influx of new residents caused a reorganization of urban housing to the unique compound complexes that typify Teotihuacan. This period is notable for its monumental architecture and sculpture, especially the construction of some of the most well-known sites of Teotihuacan, the Pyramids of the Sun and Moon. Further, the shift of political power from the Temple of the Feathered Serpent and its surrounding palace structure to the Avenue of the Dead Complex occurred sometime between CE 250 and 350. Some authors believe that this represents a shift from the centralized, monarchical political system to a more decentralized and bureaucratic organization. Around 300 CE, the Temple of the Feathered Serpent was desecrated and construction in the city proceeded in a more egalitarian direction, focusing on the building of comfortable, stone accommodations for the population.

Period III lasted from 350 to 650 CE and is known as the classical period of Teotihuacan, during which the city reached the apogee of influence in Mesoamerica. Its population is estimated at around 100,000 inhabitants, and the city was among the largest cities in the ancient world, containing 2,000 buildings within an area of 18 square kilometers. It was also during this high period when Teotihuacan contained approximately half all people in the Valley of Mexico, becoming a kind of primate city of Mesoamerica. This period saw a massive reconstruction of buildings, and the Temple of the Feathered Serpent, which dates back to the previous period, was covered with a plaza with rich sculptural decoration. Typical artistic artifacts of this period are funeral masks, crafted mainly from green stone and covered with mosaics of turquoise, shell or obsidian. These masks were highly uniform in nature.

Period IV describes the time period between 650 and 750 CE. It marks the end of Teotihuacan as a major power in Mesoamerica. The city's elite housing compounds, clustered around the Avenue of the Dead, bear many burn marks, and archeologists hypothesize that the city experienced civil strife that hastened its decline. Factors that also led to the decline of the city included disruptions in tributary relations, increased social stratification, and power struggles between the ruling and intermediary elites. Following this decline, Teotihuacan continued to be inhabited, though it never reached its previous levels of population.

=== Origins and foundation ===
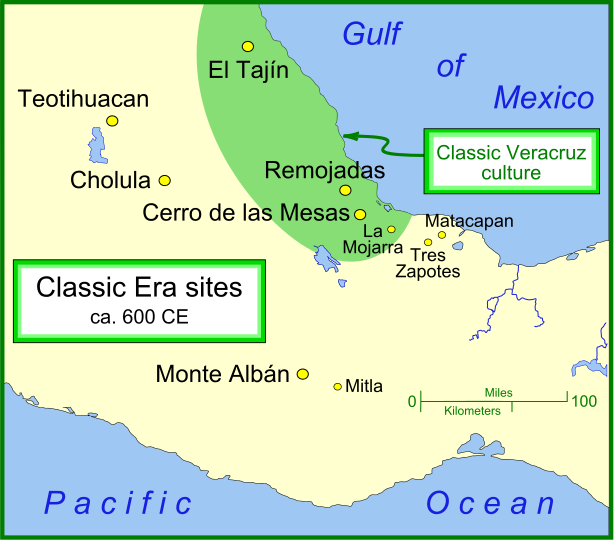
Teotihuacan and other important Classic Era settlements

The early history of Teotihuacan is quite mysterious, and the origin of its founders is uncertain. Around 300 BCE, people of the central and southeastern areas of Mesoamerica began to gather into larger settlements. Teotihuacan was the largest urban center of Mesoamerica before the Aztecs, almost 1000 years prior to their epoch. The city was already in ruins by the time of the Aztecs. For many years, archeologists believed it was built by the Toltec. This belief was based on colonial period texts, such as the Florentine Codex, which attributed the site to the Toltecs. However, the Nahuatl word "Toltec" generally means "craftsman of the highest level" and may not always refer to the Toltec civilization centered at Tula, Hidalgo. Since Toltec civilization flourished centuries after Teotihuacan, the people could not have been the city's founders.

In the Late Formative era, a number of urban centers arose in central Mexico. The most prominent of these appears to have been Cuicuilco, on the southern shore of Lake Texcoco. Scholars have speculated that the eruption of the Xitle volcano may have prompted a mass emigration out of the central valley and into the Teotihuacan valley. These settlers may have founded or accelerated the growth of Teotihuacan.

Other scholars have put forth the Totonac people as the founders of Teotihuacan and have suggested that Teotihuacan was a multi-ethnic state since they find diverse cultural aspects connected to the Zapotec, Mixtec, and Maya peoples. The builders of Teotihuacan took advantage of the geography in the Basin of Mexico. From the swampy ground, they constructed raised beds, called chinampas, creating high agricultural productivity despite old methods of cultivation. This allowed for the formation of channels, and subsequently canoe traffic, to transport food from farms around the city. The earliest buildings at Teotihuacan date to about 200 BCE. The largest pyramid, the Pyramid of the Sun, was completed by 100 CE.

=== Year 378: Conquest of Tikal ===
Evidence of a king or other authoritarian ruler is strikingly absent in Teotihuacan. Contemporaneous cities in the same region, including Mayan and Zapotec, as well as the earlier Olmec civilization, left ample attestations of dynastic authoritarian sovereignty in the form of royal palaces, ceremonial ball courts, and depictions of war, conquest, and humiliated captives. However, no such artifacts have been found in Teotihuacan. Many scholars have thus concluded that Teotihuacan was led by some sort of "collective governance."

In January 378, the warlord Sihyaj K'ahk' (literally, "born of fire" in Maya language, although the original teotihuacano spelling is unknown), depicted with artifacts and the feather-serpent imagery associated with Teotihuacan culture, conquered Tikal, 1,000 kilometres (600 mi) away from Teotihuacan, removing and replacing the Maya king, with support from El Peru and Naachtun, as recorded by Stela 31 at Tikal and other monuments in the Maya region. At this time, the Spearthrower Owl ruler was also associated with Teotihuacan culture. Linda Manzanilla wrote in 2015:

In 378 a group of Teotihuacanos organized a coup d'etat in Tikal, Guatemala. This was not the Teotihuacan state; it was a group of the Feathered-Serpent people, thrown out of the city. The Feathered-Serpent Pyramid was burnt, all the sculptures were torn from the temple, and another platform was built to efface the facade ...

=== Year 426: Conquest of Copán and Quiriguá ===
In 426, the Copán ruling dynasty was created with K'inich Yax K'uk' Mo' as the first king. The Dynasty went on to have sixteen rulers. Copán is located in modern-day Honduras, as described by Copán Altar Q. Soon thereafter, Yax K'uk' Mo' installed Tok Casper as king of Quiriguá, about 50 km north of Copán.

=== Zenith ===
The city reached its peak in 450 CE when it was the center of a powerful culture whose influence extended through much of the Mesoamerican region. At this time, the city covered over 30 km^{2} (over 11 1/2 square miles), and perhaps housed a population of 150,000 people, with one estimate reaching as high as 250,000. Although, more recent residential structure analysis by Smith supports a population estimate of around 100,000 people. Various districts in the city housed people from across the Teotihuacan region of influence, which spread south as far as Guatemala. Notably absent from the city are fortifications and military structures. George L. Cowgill argued that Teotihuacan’s most rapid growth took place between about 100 BCE and 200 CE, when much of the Basin of Mexico population became concentrated in the city. He also suggested that after this period the city’s territorial extent changed little, while population growth slowed and appears to have leveled off by the third century.

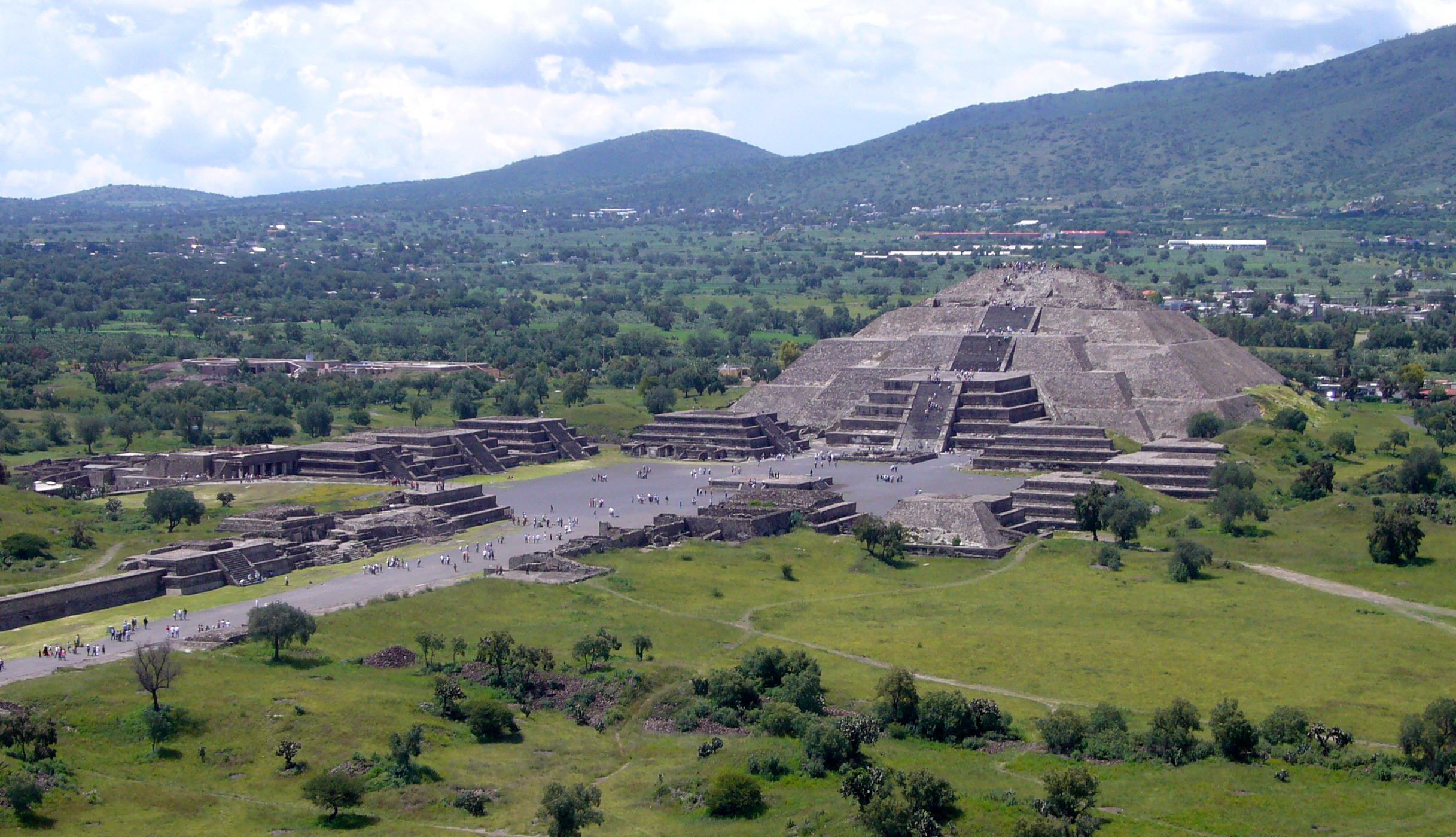
View of the Pyramid of the Moon from the Pyramid of the Sun

The nature of political and cultural interactions between Teotihuacan and the centers of the Maya region (as well as elsewhere in Mesoamerica) has been a long-standing and significant area for debate. Substantial exchange and interaction occurred over the centuries from the Terminal Preclassic to the Mid-Classic period. "Teotihuacan-inspired ideologies" and motifs persisted at Maya centers into the Late Classic, long after Teotihuacan itself had declined. However, scholars debate the extent and degree of Teotihuacan influence. Some believe that it had direct and militaristic dominance while others view the adoption of "foreign" traits as part of a selective, conscious, and bi-directional cultural diffusion. Cowgill suggested that Teotihuacan’s influence in other regions may have depended less on direct territorial control than on prestige, religious symbolism, and the strategic use of imagery associated with sacred war. New discoveries have suggested that Teotihuacan was not much different in its interactions with other centers from the later empires, such as the Toltec and Aztec. It is believed that Teotihuacan had a major influence on the Preclassic and Classic Maya.

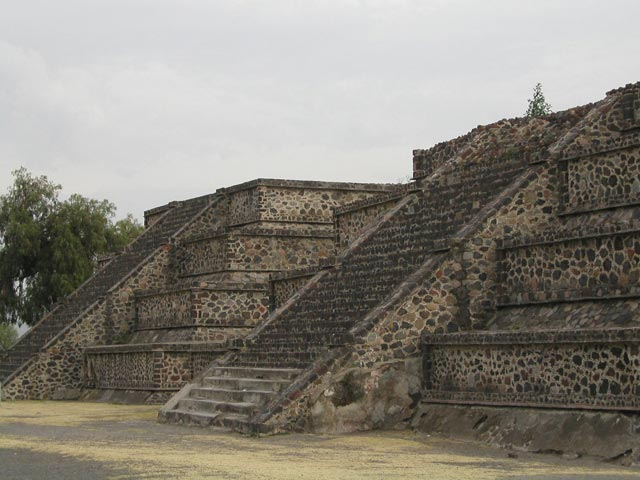
Platform along the Avenue of the Dead showing the talud-tablero architectural style

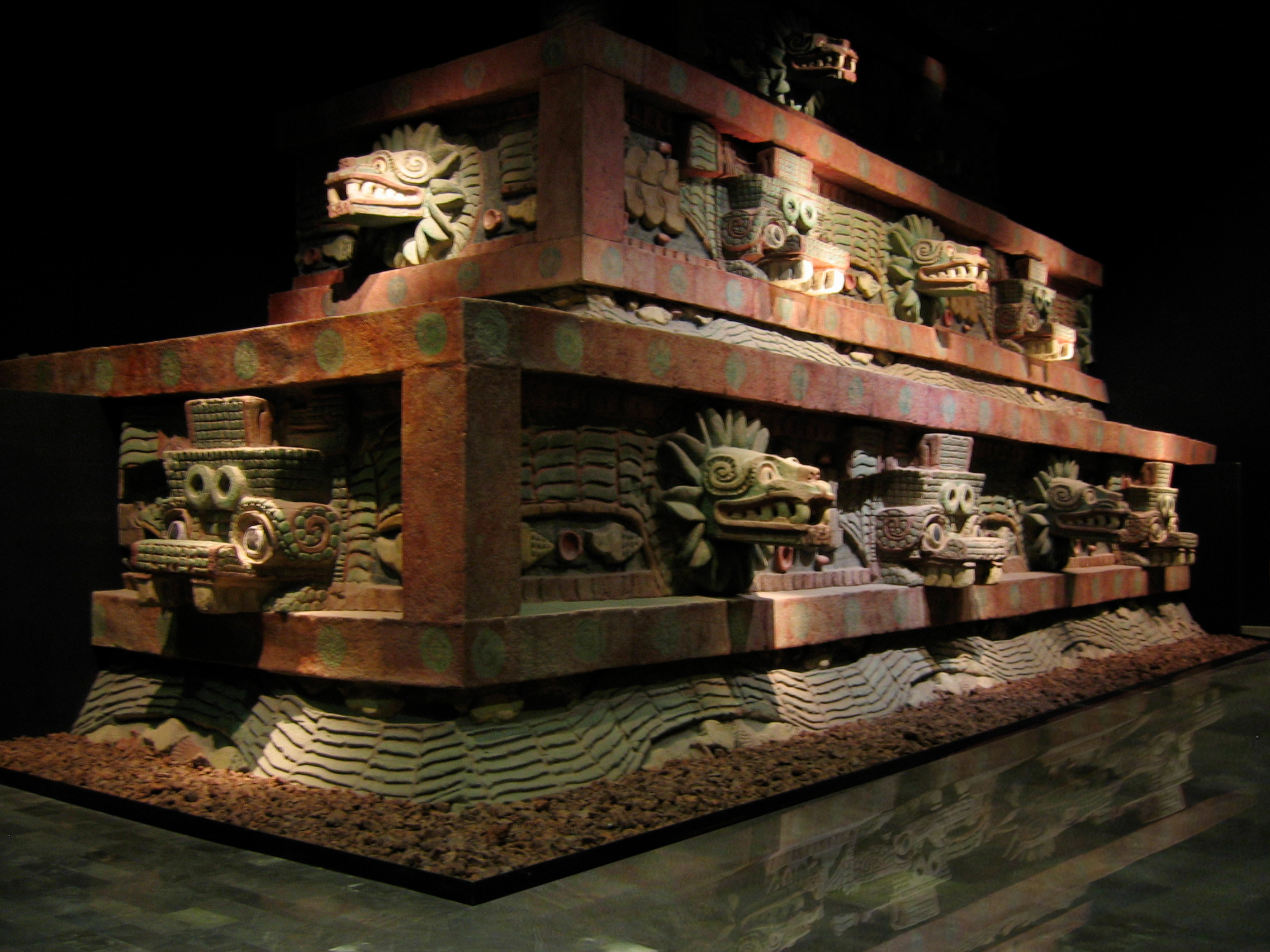
Restored portion of Teotihucan architecture showing the typical Mesoamerican use of red paint complemented on gold and jade decoration upon marble and granite.

Architectural styles prominent at Teotihuacan are found widely dispersed at a number of distant Mesoamerican sites, which some researchers have interpreted as evidence for Teotihuacan's far-reaching interactions and political or militaristic dominance. A style particularly associated with Teotihuacan is known as talud-tablero, in which an inwards-sloping external side of a structure (talud) is surmounted by a rectangular panel (tablero). Variants of the generic style are found in a number of Maya region sites including Tikal, Kaminaljuyu, Copan, Becan, and Oxkintok, and particularly in the Petén Basin and the central Guatemalan highlands. The talud-tablero style pre-dates its earliest appearance at Teotihuacan in the Early Classic period; it appears to have originated in the Tlaxcala-Puebla region during the Preclassic. Analyses have traced the development into local variants of the talud-tablero style at sites such as Tikal, where its use precedes the 5th-century appearance of iconographic motifs shared with Teotihuacan. The talud-tablero style disseminated through Mesoamerica generally from the end of the Preclassic period, and not specifically, or solely, via Teotihuacano influence. It is unclear how or from where the style spread into the Maya region. During its zenith, the main structures at Teotihuacan, including the pyramids, were painted in impressive shades of dark red, with some small spots persisting to this day.

The city was a center of industry, home to many potters, jewelers, and craftspeople. Teotihuacan is known for producing a great number of obsidian artifacts. No ancient Teotihuacano non-ideographic texts are known to exist (or known to have once existed). Inscriptions from Maya cities show that Teotihuacan nobility traveled to, and perhaps conquered, local rulers as far away as Honduras. Maya inscriptions note an individual named by scholars as "Spearthrower Owl", apparently ruler of Teotihuacan, who reigned for over 60 years and installed his relatives as rulers of Tikal and Uaxactun in Guatemala. Cowgill also proposed that rulers in early Teotihuacan were probably both able and powerful, but that over time political authority may have become more collective and less centered on a single individual ruler.

Scholars have based interpretations of Teotihuacan culture on its archeology, murals that adorn the site (and others, like the Wagner Murals, found in private collections), and hieroglyphic inscriptions made by the Maya describing their encounters with Teotihuacan conquerors. The creation of murals, perhaps tens of thousands of murals, reached its height between 450 and 650. The artistry of the painters was unrivaled in Mesoamerica and has been compared with that of painters in Renaissance Florence, Italy.

=== Collapse ===
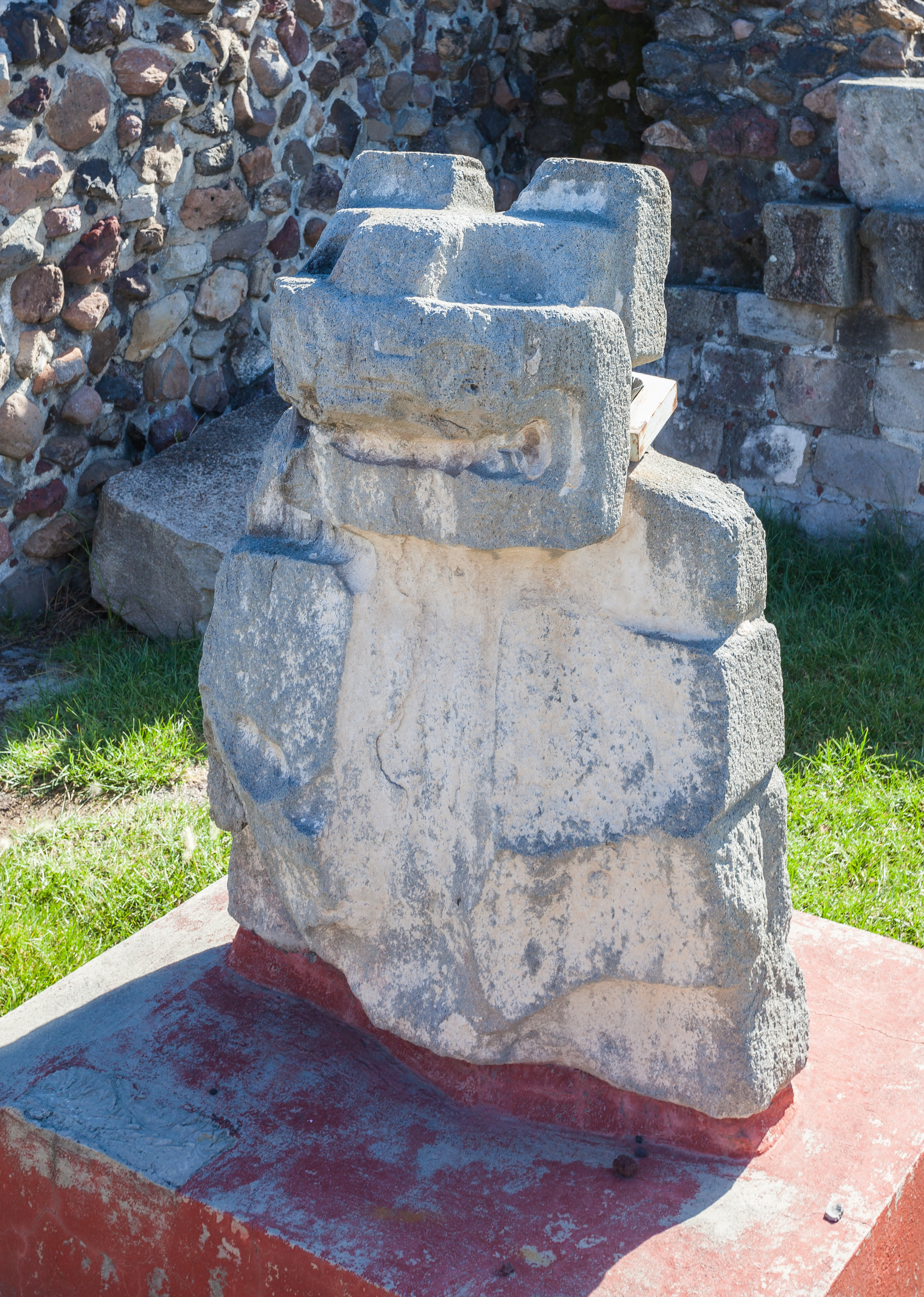
Felid head, Teotihuacán, Mexico.

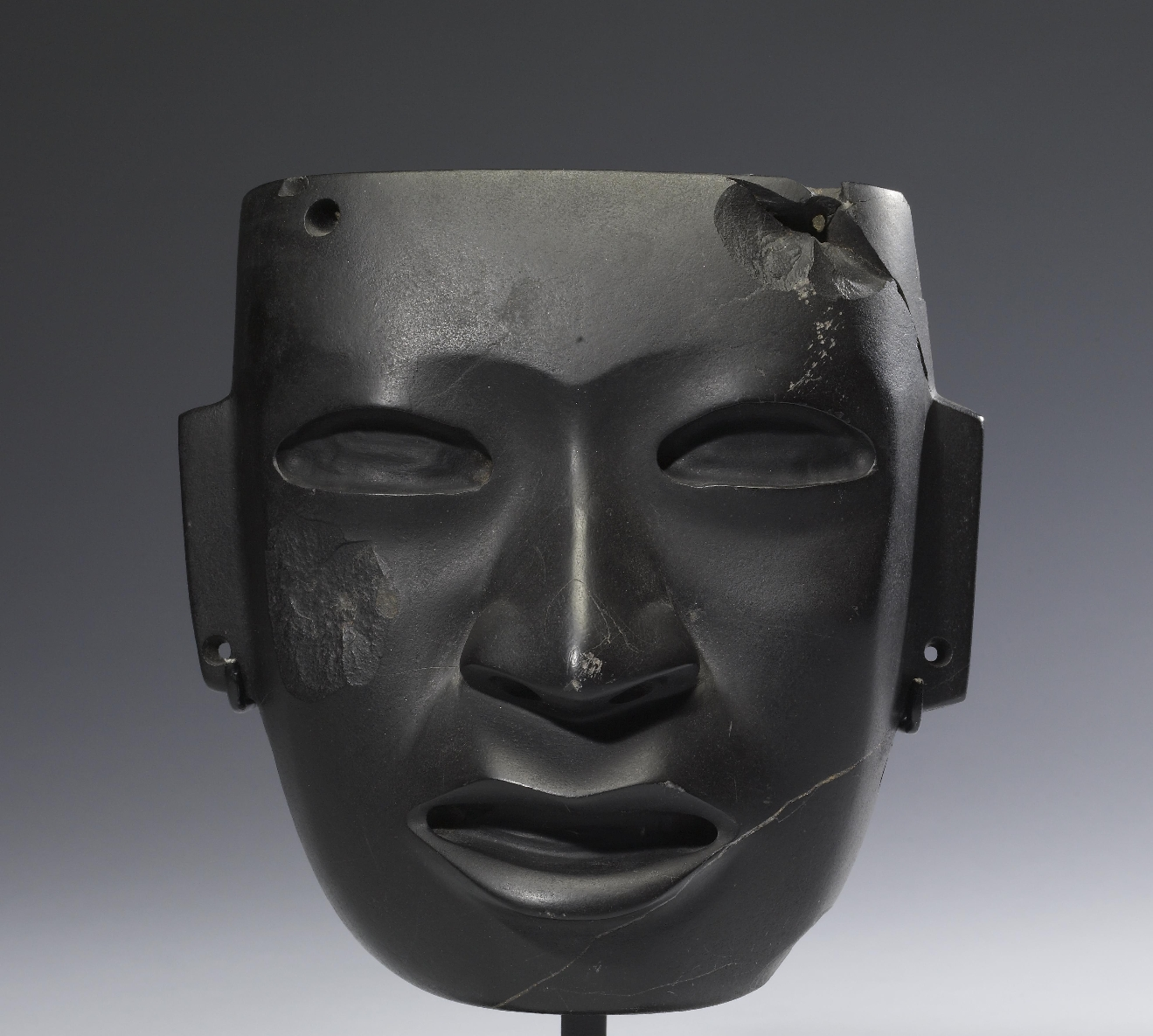
Teotihuacán-style mask, Classical period. Walters Art Museum.

Scholars originally thought that invaders attacked the city in the 7th or 8th century, sacking and burning it. More recent evidence, however, seems to indicate that the burning was limited to the structures and dwellings associated primarily with the ruling class. Some think this suggests that the burning was from an internal uprising and the invasion theory is flawed because early archeological efforts were focused exclusively on the palaces and temples, places used by the upper classes. Because all of these sites showed burning, archeologists concluded that the whole city was burned. Instead, it is now known that the destruction was centered on major civic structures along the Avenue of the Dead. The sculptures inside palatial structures, such as Xalla, were shattered. No traces of foreign invasion are visible at the site.

Evidence for population decline beginning around the 6th century lends some support to the internal unrest hypothesis. The decline of Teotihuacan has been correlated to lengthy droughts related to the climate changes of 535–536, possibly caused by the eruption of the Ilopango volcano in El Salvador. This theory of ecological decline is supported by archeological remains that show a rise in the percentage of juvenile skeletons with evidence of malnutrition during the 6th century, further supporting the hypothesis of famine as one of the more plausible reasons for the decline of Teotihuacan. Urbanized Teotihuacanos would likely have been dependent on agricultural crops such as maize, beans, amaranth, tomatillos, and pumpkins. If climate change affected crop yields, then the harvest would not have been sufficient to feed Teotihucan's extensive population. However, the two main hypotheses are not mutually exclusive. Drought leading to famine could have led to incursions from smaller surrounding civilizations as well as internal unrest.

As Teotihuacan fell in local prominence, other nearby centers, such as Cholula, Xochicalco, and Cacaxtla, competed to fill the power void. They may have even aligned themselves against Teotihuacan to seize the opportunity to further reduce its influence and power. The art and architecture at these sites emulate Teotihuacan forms but also demonstrate an eclectic mix of motifs and iconography from other parts of Mesoamerica, particularly the Maya region.

The sudden destruction of Teotihuacan was common for Mesoamerican city-states of the Classic and Epi-Classic period. Many Maya states suffered similar fates in subsequent centuries, a series of events often referred to as the Classic Maya collapse. Nearby, in the Morelos valley, Xochicalco was sacked and burned in 900, and Tula met a similar fate around 1150.

=== Aztec period ===
During the 1200s CE, Nahua migrants repopulated the area. By the 1300s, it had fallen under the sway of Huexotla, and in 1409 was assigned its own tlatoani, Huetzin, a son of the tlatoani of Huexotla. But his reign was cut short when Tezozomoc, tlatoani of Azcapotzalco, invaded Huexotla and the neighboring Acolhua lands in 1418. Huetzin was deposed by the invaders, and Tezozomoc installed a man named Totomochtzin. Less than a decade later, in 1427, the Aztec Empire formed, and Teotihuacan was vassalized once more by the Acolhua.

The 1580 relacion geografica of Teotihuacan affirmed that Nahuatl was the most common language, but minorities spoke Otomi and "Popoloca" (possibly identified with the modern Popoloca languages).

== Culture ==
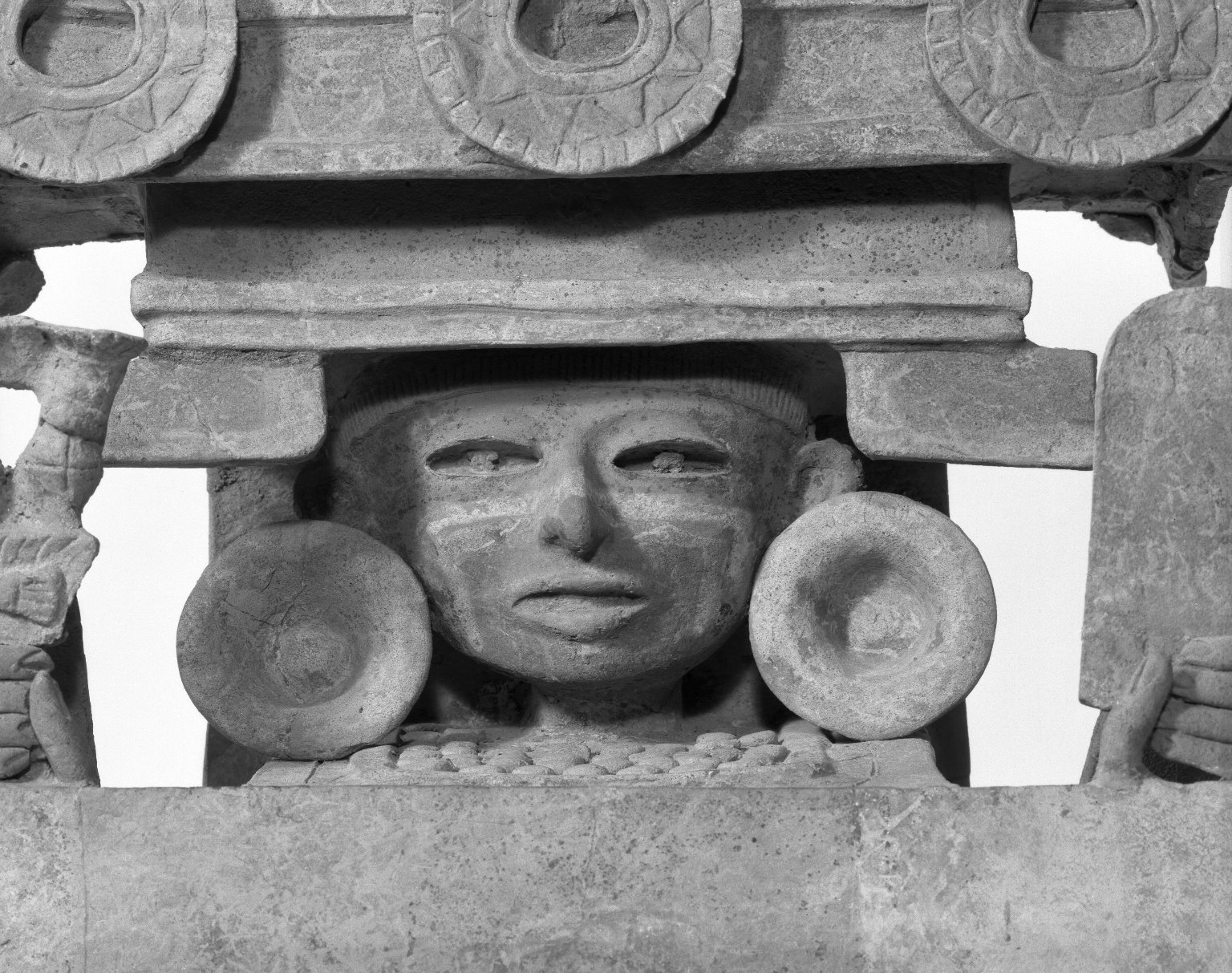
Incensario Lid, Teotihuacan style, 400–700 CE, Brooklyn Museum

Archeological evidence suggests that Teotihuacan was a multi-ethnic city, and while the predominant language or languages used in Teotihuacan have been lost to history, early forms of Totonac and Nahuatl seem to be highly plausible. This apparent regionally diverse population of Teotihuacan can be traced back to a natural disaster that occurred prior to its population boom. At one point in time, Teotihuacan was rivaled by another basin power, Cuicuilco. Both cities, roughly the same size and hubs for trade, were productive centers of artisans and commerce. Roughly around 100 BCE, however, the power dynamic changed when Mount Xitle, an active volcano, erupted, and heavily affected Cuicuilco and the farmland that supported it. It is believed that the later exponential growth of Teotihuacan's population was due to the subsequent migration of those displaced by the eruption. While this eruption is referenced as being the primary cause of the mass exodus, recent advancements of dating have shed light on an even earlier eruption. The eruption of Popocatepetl in the middle of the first century preceded that of Xitle, and is believed to have begun the aforementioned degradation of agricultural lands and structural damage to the city. Xitle's eruption further instigated the abandonment of Cuicuilco.

In the Tzacualli phase (c. 1–150 CE), Teotihuacan saw a population growth to approximately 60,000 to 80,000 people, most of whom are believed to have come from the Mexican basin. Following this growth, however, the influx of new residents slowed, and evidence suggests that, by the Miccaotli phase, c. 200 CE, the urban population had reached its maximum.

In 2001, Terrence Kaufman presented linguistic evidence suggesting that an important ethnic group in Teotihuacan was of Totonacan or Mixe–Zoquean linguistic affiliation. He uses this to explain general influences from Totonacan and Mixe–Zoquean languages in many other Mesoamerican languages, whose people did not have any known history of contact with either of the abovementioned groups. Other scholars maintain that the largest population group must have been of Otomi ethnicity because the Otomi language is known to have been spoken in the area around Teotihuacan both before and after the Classic period and not during the middle period.

The laboring classes, themselves also stratified, consisted of farmers, skilled craftworkers, and the peripheral rural population. The city dwelling craftspeople of various specialties were housed in apartment complexes distributed throughout the city, known as neighborhood centers, and evidence shows that these centers were the economic and cultural engines of Teotihuacan. Established by the elite to showcase the sumptuary goods that the resident craftsmen provided, the neighborhood centers representing diversity in goods was aided by the heavy concentration of immigrated individuals from different regions of Mesoamerica. Along with archeological evidence pointing to one of the primary traded items being textiles, craftspeople capitalized on their mastery of painting, building, the performance of music and military training. These neighborhood centers closely resembled individual compounds, often surrounded by physical barriers separating them from the others. In this way, Teotihuacan developed an internal economic competition that fueled productivity and helped create a social structure of its own that differed from the larger structure. The repeated actions of the craftworkers left their physical mark. Based on the wear of teeth, archeologists were able to determine that some bodies worked with fibers with their frontal teeth, insinuating that they were involved with making nets, like those depicted in mural art. Female skeletons provided evidence that they might have sewn or painted for long periods of time, indicative of the headdresses that were created as well as pottery which was fired and painted. Wear on specific joints indicate the carrying of heavy objects over an extended period of time. Evidence of these heavy materials is found in the copious amounts of imported pottery, and raw materials found on-site, such as rhyolitic glass shards, marble, and slate. The residences of the rural population of the city were in enclaves between the middle-class residences or the periphery of the city while smaller encampments filled with earthenware from other regions, also suggest that merchants were situated in their own encampments as well.

Teotihuacan compounds show evidence of being segregated into three classes: high elites, intermediate elites, and the laboring class. The majority of these three classes lived in distinct apartment compounds respective to their status, with compounds consisting of multiple dwellings. Each dwelling acted as a household, with between 5 and 10 inhabitants per dwelling, depending on the residence type. In addition to Low-status, Intermediate-status, and Elite residencies, residents of Teotihuacan also lived in Temple Housing. Residential architectural structures seem to be differentiable by the artistry and complexity of the structure itself. Based on the quality of construction materials and sizes of rooms as well as the quality of assorted objects found in the residency, dwellings radiating outward from the Central district and along the Avenue of the Dead might have been occupied by higher status individuals. However, Teotihuacan overall does not appear to have been organized into discrete zoning districts. The more elite compounds were often decorated with elaborate murals. Thematic elements of these murals included processions of lavishly dressed priests, jaguar figures, the storm god deity, and an anonymous goddess whose hands offer gifts of maize, precious stones, and water. Rulers who may have requested to be immortalized through art are noticeably absent in Teotihuacan artwork. Observed artwork, instead, tends to portray institutionalized offices and deities. It suggests their art glorifies nature and the supernatural and emphasizes egalitarian rather than aristocratic values. Also absent from Teotihuacan artwork is writing, despite the city having a strong network of contact with the literate Maya.

George L. Cowgill's research has been significantly important in understanding how social differences played out in daily life in Teotihuacan. He studied the apartment compounds where a majority of the population lived, and found that they were not just homes, but also key units of social and economic organization. These compounds showed different levels of status and access to resources. Cowgill used quantitative methods such as population estimation models, spatial analysis of settlement density, and statistical evaluation of artifact distributions to better understand urban organization and social complexity at Teotihuacan.

=== Religion ===
In An Illustrated Dictionary of the Gods and Symbols of Ancient Mexico and the Maya, Miller and Taube list eight deities:

- The Storm God
- The Great Goddess
- The Feathered Serpent. An important deity in Teotihuacan; most closely associated with the Feathered Serpent Pyramid (Temple of the Feathered Serpent).
- The Old God
- The War Serpent. Taube has differentiated two different serpent deities whose depictions alternate on the Feathered Serpent Pyramid: the Feathered Serpent and what he calls the "War Serpent". Other researchers are more skeptical.
- The Netted Jaguar
- The Pulque God
- The Fat God. Known primarily from figurines and so assumed to be related to household rituals.

Esther Pasztory adds one more:

- The Flayed God. Known primarily from figurines and so assumed to be related to household rituals.

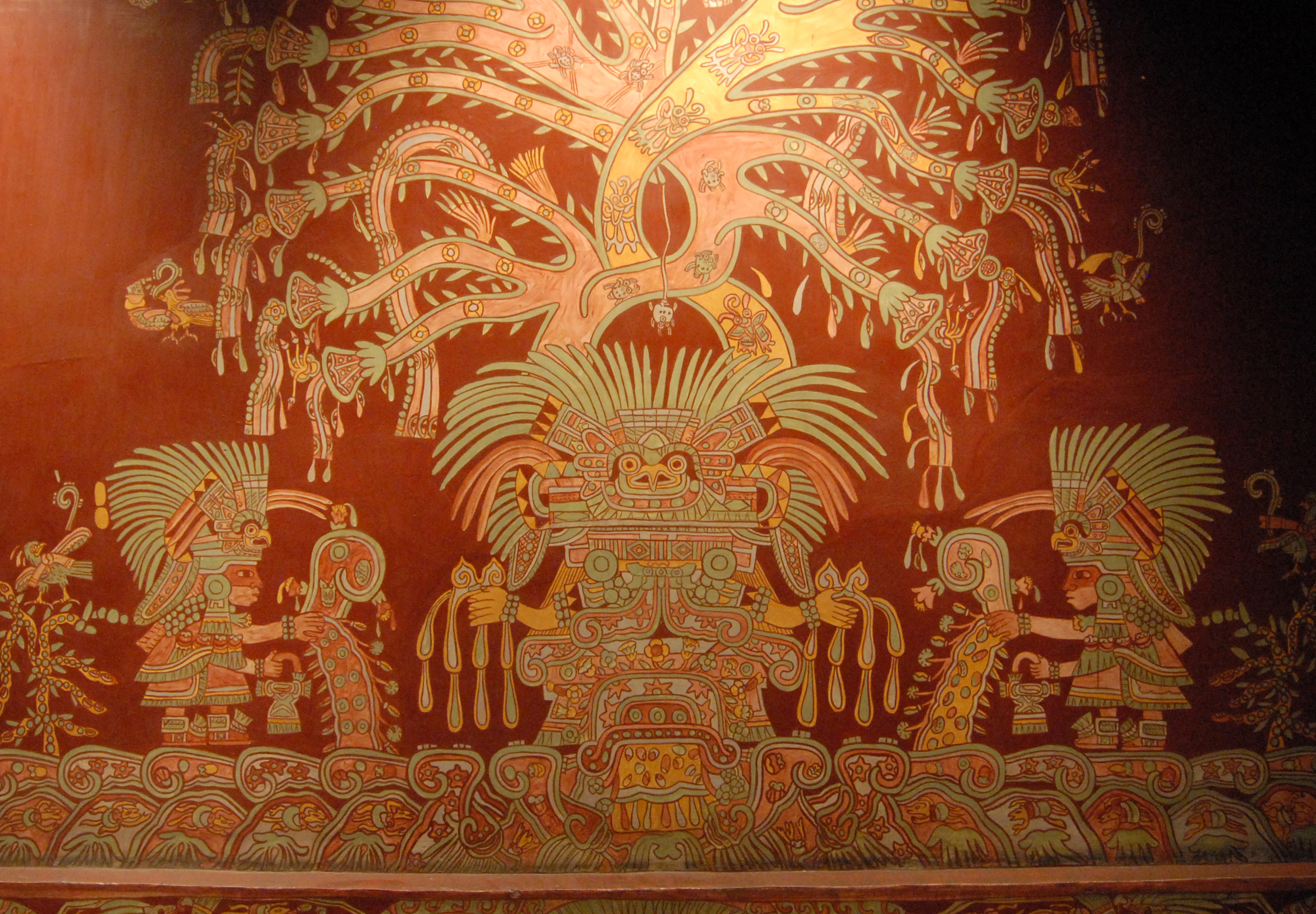
A mural showing what has been identified as the Great Goddess of Teotihuacan

The consensus among scholars is that the primary deity of Teotihuacan was the Great Goddess of Teotihuacan. The dominant civic architecture is the pyramid. Politics were based on the state religion, and religious leaders were the political leaders. Religious leaders would commission artists to create religious artworks for ceremonies and rituals. The artwork likely commissioned would have been a mural or a censer depicting gods like the Great Goddess of Teotihuacan or the Feathered Serpent. Censers would be lit during religious rituals to invoke the gods including rituals with human sacrifice.

As evidenced from human and animal remains found during excavations of the pyramids in the city, Teotihuacanos practiced human sacrifice. Scholars believe that the people offered human sacrifices as part of a dedication when buildings were expanded or constructed. The victims were probably enemy warriors captured in battle and brought to the city for ritual sacrifice to ensure the city could prosper. Some men were decapitated, some had their hearts removed, others were killed by being hit several times over the head, and some were buried alive. Animals that were considered sacred and represented mythical powers and the military were also buried alive or captured and held in cages such as cougars, a wolf, eagles, a falcon, an owl, and even venomous snakes.

Numerous stone masks have been found at Teotihuacan, and have been generally believed to have been used during a funerary context. However, other scholars call this into question, noting that the masks "do not seem to have come from burials".

=== Population ===
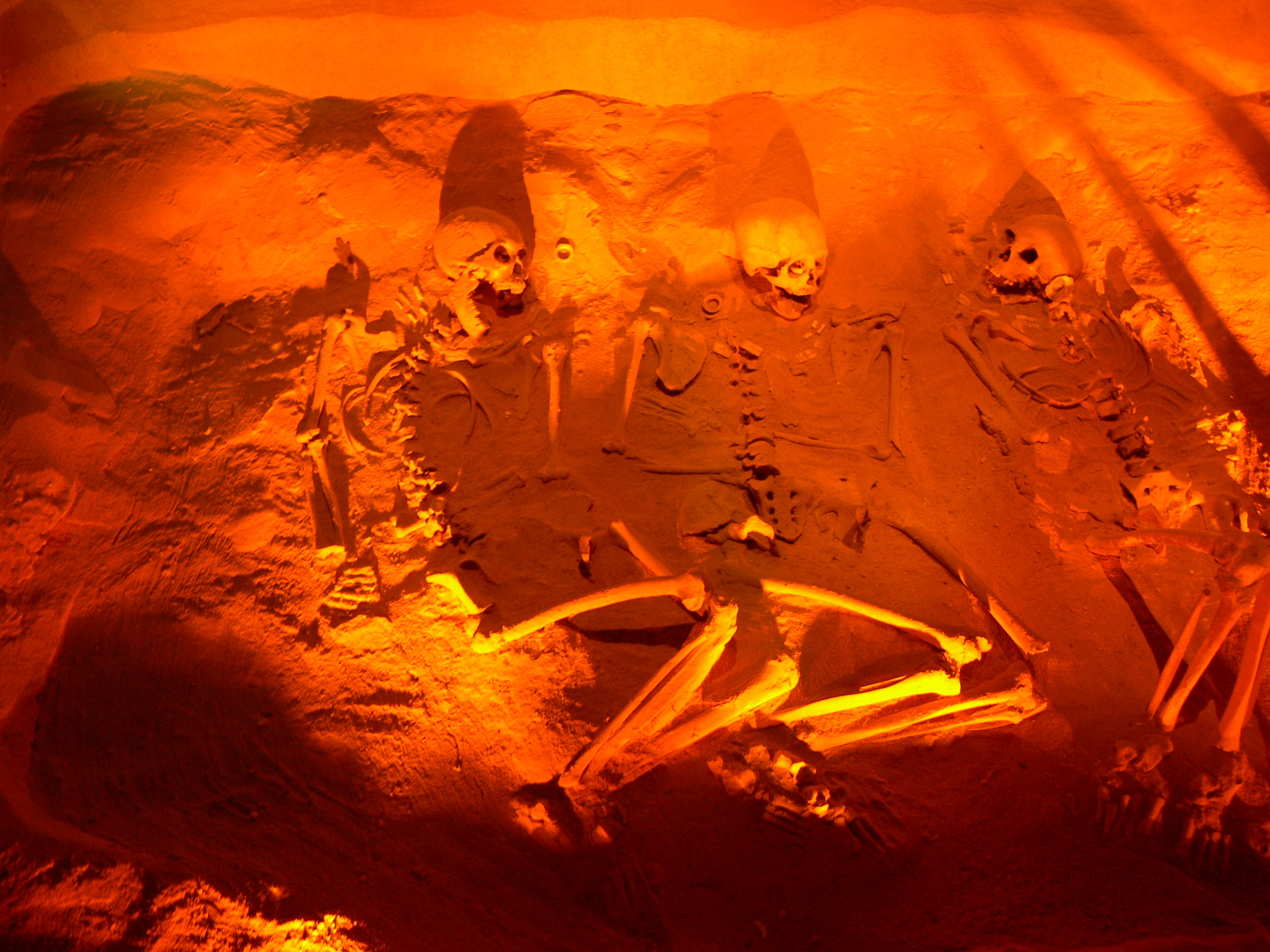
Human sacrifices found at the foundations of La Ciudadela.

Teotihuacan had one of the largest, or perhaps had the largest, population of any city in the Basin of Mexico during its occupation. Teotihuacan was a large pre-historic city that underwent massive population growth and sustained it over most of the city's occupancy. In 100 CE, the population could be estimated at around 60,000–80,000, after 200 years of the city's occupancy, within 20 km^{2} of the city. The population, eventually, stabilized around 100,000 people around 300 CE.

The population reached its peak numbers around 400 to 500 CE. During 400 to 500 CE, the Xolalpan period, the city's population was estimated to be 100,000 to 200,000 people. This number was achieved by estimating compound sizes to hold approximately 60 to 100, with 2,000 compounds. These high numbers continued until the city started to decline between 600 and 700 CE.

One of Teotihuacan's neighborhoods, Teopancazco, was occupied during most of the time Teotihuacan was as well. It showed that Teotihuacan was a multiethnic city that was broken up into areas of different ethnicities and workers. This neighborhood was important in two ways; the high infant mortality rate and the role of the different ethnicities. The high infant mortality rate was important within the neighborhood, and the city at large, as there are a large number of perinatal skeletons at Teopancazco. This suggests that the population of Teotihuacan was sustained and grew due to people coming into the city, rather than the population reproducing. The influx of people came from surrounding areas, bringing different ethnicities to the city.

Teotihuacan also had two other neighborhoods that prominently depicted this multiethnic city picture. Both neighborhoods contained not only different architecture from the other parts of Teotihuacan but also artifacts and burial practices that began the narrative of these places. Archaeologists have also performed oxygen isotope ratio testing and strontium isotope ratio testing to determine, using the bones and the teeth of the skeletons uncovered, whether these skeletons were native to Teotihuacan or were immigrants to the city. The oxygen ratio testing can be used to determine where someone grew up, and the strontium ratio testing can be used to determine where someone was born and where they were living when they died. These tests revealed a lot of information, but specifically enabled clear distinction between the people living in the ethnic neighborhoods and those native to Teotihuacan.

One neighborhood was called Tlailotlacan and was believed to be a neighborhood of migrants predominantly from the Oaxaca region. The excavations there featured prominently artifacts in the Zapotec style of from the Zapotec region, including one tomb with an antechamber. The oxygen isotope ratio testing was particularly helpful when analyzing this neighborhood because it painted a clear picture of the initial influx from Oaxaca, followed by routine journeys back to the homeland to maintain the culture and heritage of the following generations. Later oxygen isotope ratio testing also revealed that out of the skeletons tested, four-fifths of them had immigrated to the city or were born in the city, but spent their childhood in their homeland before returning to Teotihuacan. There was evidence of constant interaction between Teotihuacan and the Oaxacan homeland through journeys taken by children and mothers, keeping the culture and the roots to their homeland alive.

The other main neighborhood was called Barrio de Los Comerciantes, or the Merchants' Barrio. There is less information about those who lived here (or perhaps more research needs to be done), but this neighborhood also had clear differences from other areas of the city. The architecture was different, featuring round adobe structures, as well as foreign pottery and artifacts identified as belonging to the Gulf Coast region. This neighborhood, similarly to Tlailotclan, saw a huge influx of immigration, determined by the strontium isotope ratio testing of bones and teeth, with people spending a significant part of their lives before death in Teotihuacan.

=== Writing and literature ===
There was a big find in the La Ventilla district that contains over 30 signs and clusters on the floor of the patio. Much of the findings in Teotihuacan suggest that the inhabitants had their own writing style. The figures were made "quickly and show control" giving the idea that they were practiced and were adequate for the needs of their society. Other societies around Teotihuacan adopted some of the symbols that were used there. The inhabitants there rarely used any other societies' symbols and art. These writing systems were not anything like those of their neighbors, but the same writings show that they must have been aware of the other writings.

In October 2025, a partial decipherment of the writing system has been proposed, identifying the language of the writing as proto-Corachol-Nahua, an early form of an Uto-Aztecan language.

=== Obsidian workshops ===
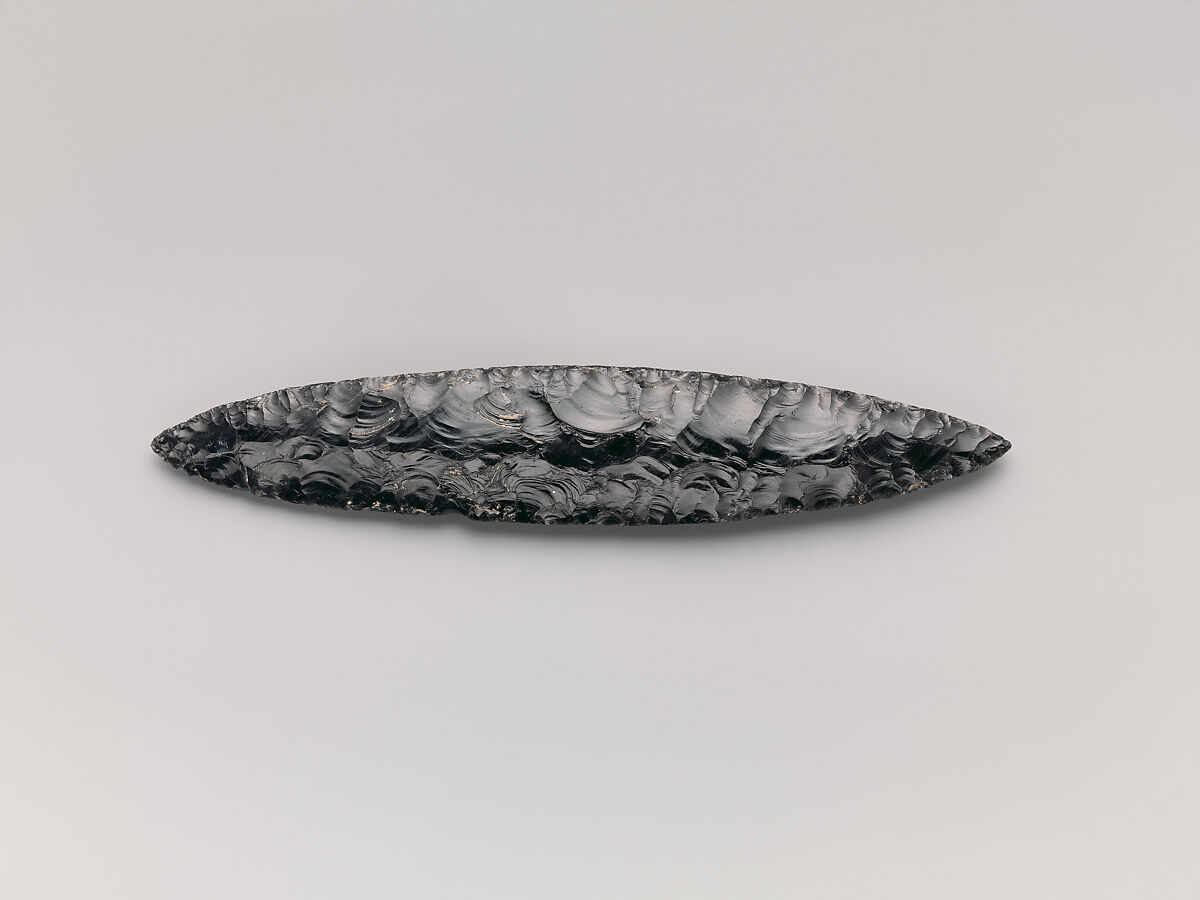
Example of a Teotihuacan Obsidian Blade, Metropolitan Museum of Art

The processing of obsidian was the most developed art and the main source of wealth in Teotihuacan and many other ancient Mesoamerican cultures. The workshops produced tools or objects of obsidian of various uses and types (black and grey colors), intended for commercial transactions beyond the geographical boundaries of the city, with cities such as Monte Alban in Oaxaca Mexico, Tikal in Guatemala, and some Mayan states. Figurines, blades, arrowheads, spikes, knife handles, jewelry, masks, or ornaments, etc were some of the most notable and common objects constructed. Obsidian came mainly from the mines of Pachuca (Teotihuacan) and its processing was the most important industry in the city, which had acquired the monopoly in the trade of obsidian in the broader Middle American region. The state also heavily monitored the trade, movement, and creation of obsidian tools, as it was such an important industry in the city that it was limited to the regional workshops where the tools were produced. This brittle yet strong rock, was mainly formed into objects by flaking off pieces from a larger cone, but wood and bone tools have also been found to have been used in the process.

== Archeological site ==
Knowledge of the huge ruins of Teotihuacan was never completely lost. After the fall of the city, various squatters lived on the site. During Aztec times, the city was a place of pilgrimage and identified with the myth of Tollan, the place where the sun was created. Today, Teotihuacan is one of the most noted archeological attractions in Mexico.

=== Excavations and investigations ===
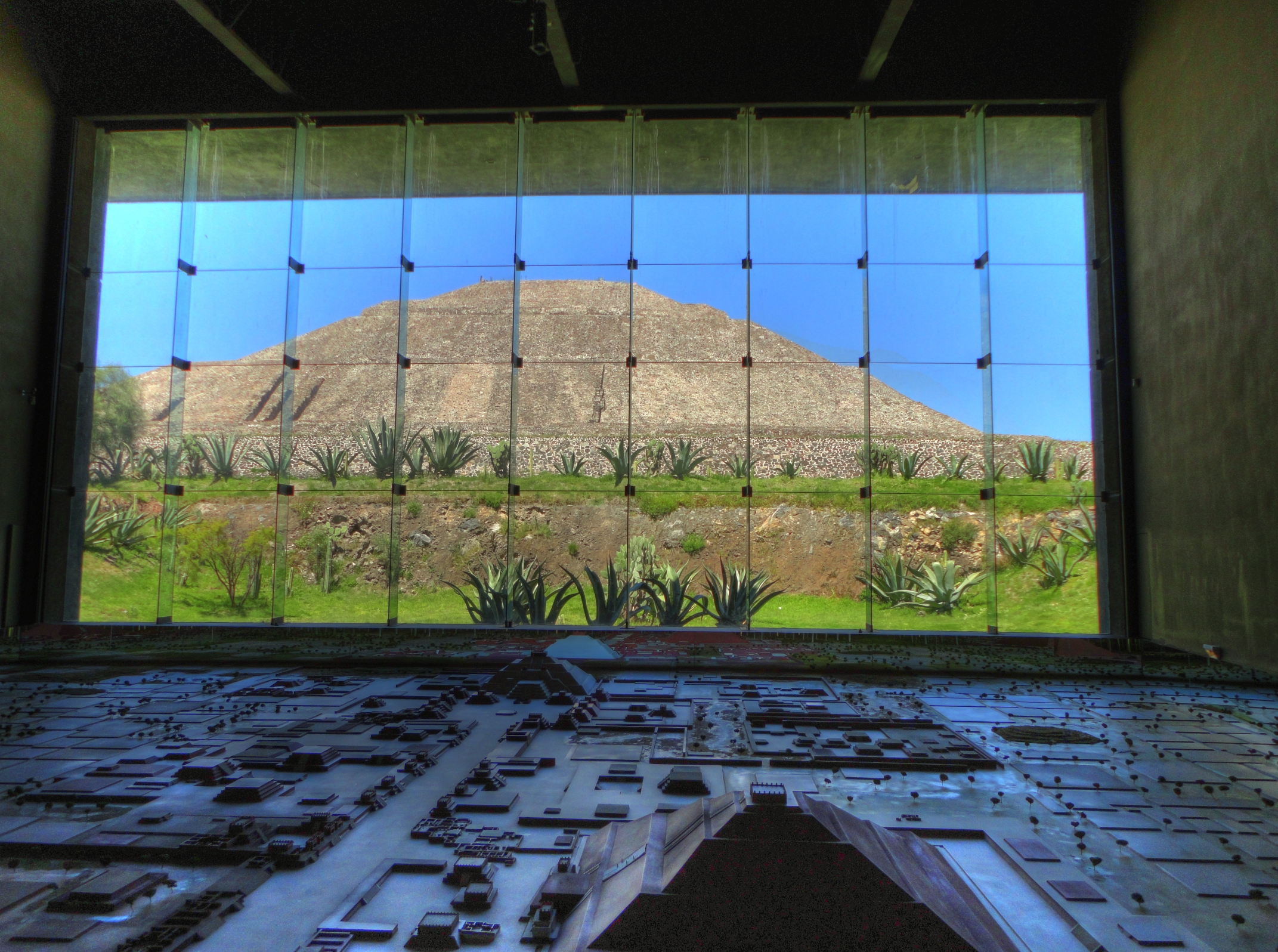
Pyramid of the Sun and the Teotihuacán Diorama at the Teotihuacán Museum.

In the late 17th century Carlos de Sigüenza y Góngora (1645–1700) made some excavations around the Pyramid of the Sun. Minor archeological excavations were conducted in the 19th century. In 1905 Mexican archeologist and government official, in the regime of Porfirio Díaz, Leopoldo Batres led a major project of excavation and restoration. The Pyramid of the Sun was restored to celebrate the centennial of the Mexican War of Independence in 1910. The site of Teotihuacan was the first to be expropriated for the national patrimony under the Law of Monuments (1897), giving jurisdiction under legislation for the Mexican state to take control. Some 250 plots were farmed on the site. Peasants who had been farming portions were ordered to leave and the Mexican government eventually paid some compensation to those individuals. A feeder train line was built to the site in 1908, which allowed the efficient hauling of material from the excavations and later brought tourists to the site. In 1910, the International Congress of Americanists met in Mexico, coinciding with the centennial celebrations, and the distinguished delegates, such as its president Eduard Seler and vice president Franz Boas were taken to the newly finished excavations.

Further excavations at the Ciudadela were carried out in the 1920s, supervised by Manuel Gamio. Between April 26 and July 29, 1932, Swedish anthropologist/archaeologist Sigvald Linné, his wife, and a small crew excavated in the Xolalpan area, part of the municipality of San Juan Teotihuacán. Other sections of the site were excavated in the 1940s and 1950s. The first site-wide project of restoration and excavation was carried out by INAH from 1960 to 1965, supervised by Jorge Acosta. This undertaking had the goals of clearing the Avenue of the Dead, consolidating the structures facing it, and excavating the Palace of Quetzalpapalotl.

Sigvald Linné 1932 investigations, Statens museer för världskultur

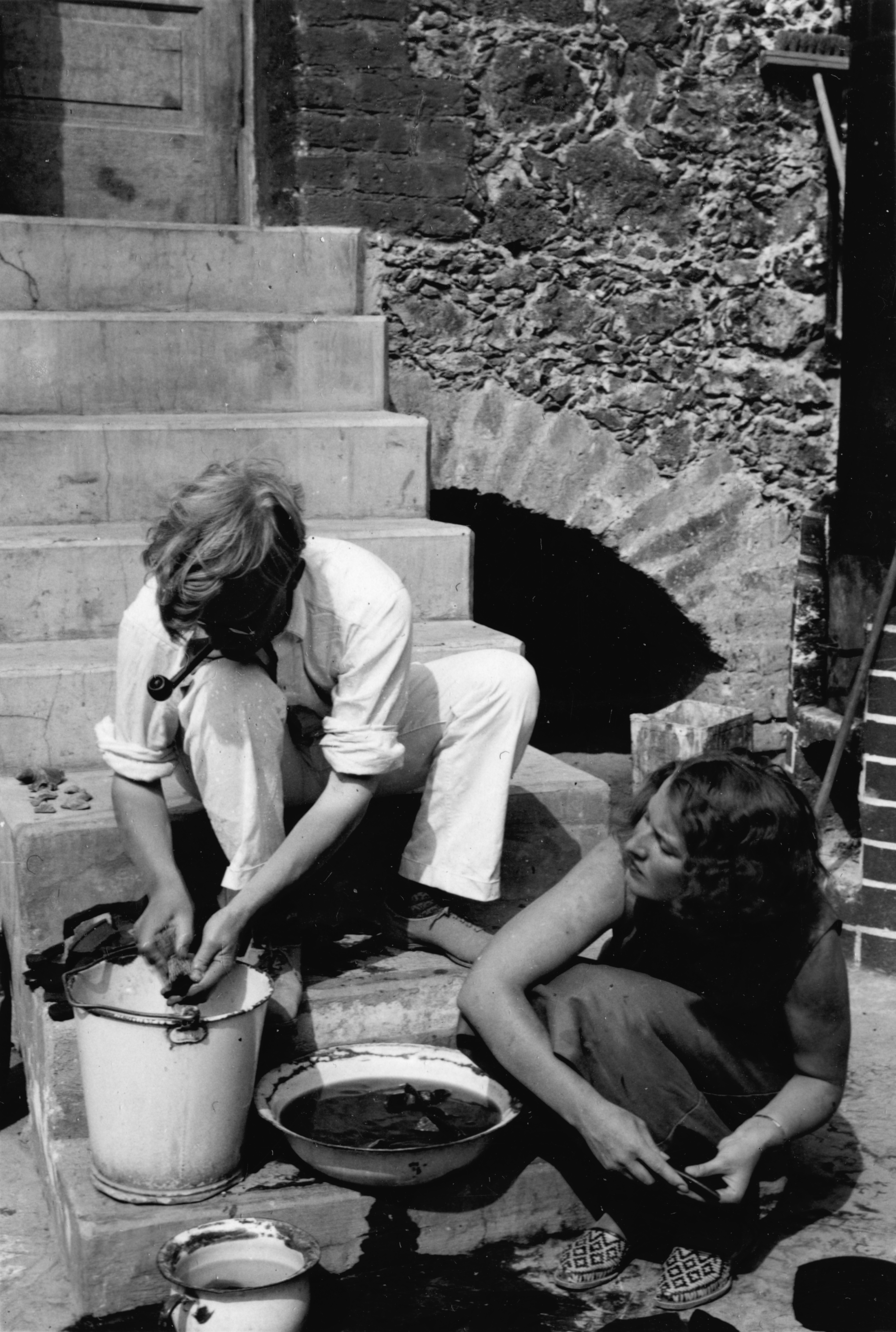

During the installation of a "sound and light" show in 1971, workers discovered the entrance to a tunnel and cave system underneath the Pyramid of the Sun. Although scholars long thought this to be a natural cave, more recent examinations have established the tunnel was entirely manmade. The interior of the Pyramid of the Sun has never been fully excavated.

In 1980–82, another major program of excavation and restoration was carried out at the Pyramid of the Feathered Serpent and the Avenue of the Dead complex. Most recently, a series of excavations at the Pyramid of the Moon have greatly expanded evidence of cultural practices.

==== Recent discoveries ====
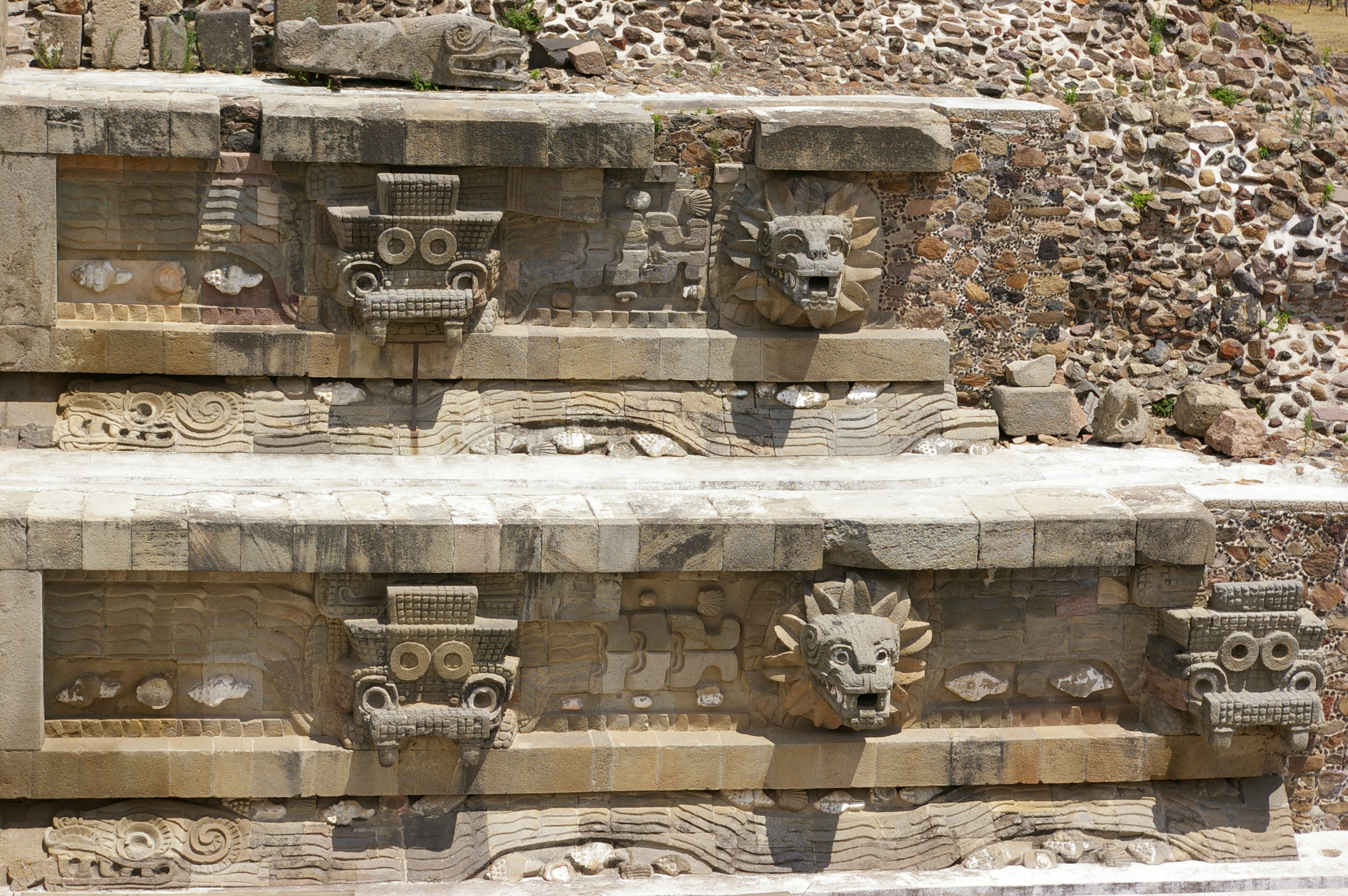
Teotihuacan – Temple of the Feathered Serpent – architectural detail to the right of the steps.

In late 2003 a tunnel beneath the Temple of the Feathered Serpent was accidentally discovered by Sergio Gómez Chávez and Julie Gazzola, archeologists of the National Institute of Anthropology and History (INAH). After days of a heavy rainstorm, Gómez Chávez noticed that a nearly 90 centimetres (35 in) wide sinkhole occurred near the base of the temple pyramid.

First trying to examine the hole with a flashlight from above Gómez could see only darkness, so tied with a line of heavy rope around his waist he was lowered by several colleagues, and descending into the murk he realized it was a perfectly cylindrical shaft. At the bottom he came to rest in an apparently ancient construction – a man-made tunnel, blocked in both directions by immense stones. Gómez was aware that archeologists had previously discovered a narrow tunnel underneath the Pyramid of the Sun and supposed he was now observing a kind of similar mirror tunnel, leading to a subterranean chamber beneath the Temple of the Feathered Serpent. He decided initially to elaborate on a clear hypothesis and to obtain approval. Meanwhile, he erected a tent over the sinkhole to preserve it from the hundreds of thousands of tourists who visit Teotihuacán. Researchers reported that the tunnel was believed to have been sealed in 200 CE.

Preliminary planning of the exploration and fundraising took more than six years.

Before the start of excavations, beginning in the early months of 2004, Victor Manuel Velasco Herrera, from UNAM Institute of Geophysics, determined with the help of ground-penetrating radar (GPR) and a team of some 20 archeologists and workers the approximate length of the tunnel and the presence of internal chambers. They scanned the earth under the Ciudadela, returning every afternoon to upload the results to Gómez's computers. By 2005, the digital map was complete. The archeologists explored the tunnel with a remote-controlled robot called Tlaloc II-TC, equipped with an infrared camera and a laser scanner that generates 3D visualization to perform three-dimensional register of the spaces beneath the temple. A small opening in the tunnel wall was made and the scanner captured the first images, 37 metres into the passage.

In 2009, the government granted Gómez permission to dig. By the end of 2009 archeologists of the INAH located the entrance to the tunnel that leads to galleries under the pyramid, where remains of rulers of the ancient city might have been deposited. In August 2010 Gómez Chávez, now director of Tlalocan Project: Underground Road, announced that INAH's investigation of the tunnel – closed nearly 1,800 years ago by Teotihuacan dwellers – would proceed. The INAH team, consisting of about 30 people supported by national and international advisors at the highest scientific levels, intended to enter the tunnel in September–October 2010. This excavation, the deepest made at the Pre-Hispanic site, was part of the commemorations of the 100th anniversary of archeological excavations at Teotihuacan and its opening to the public.

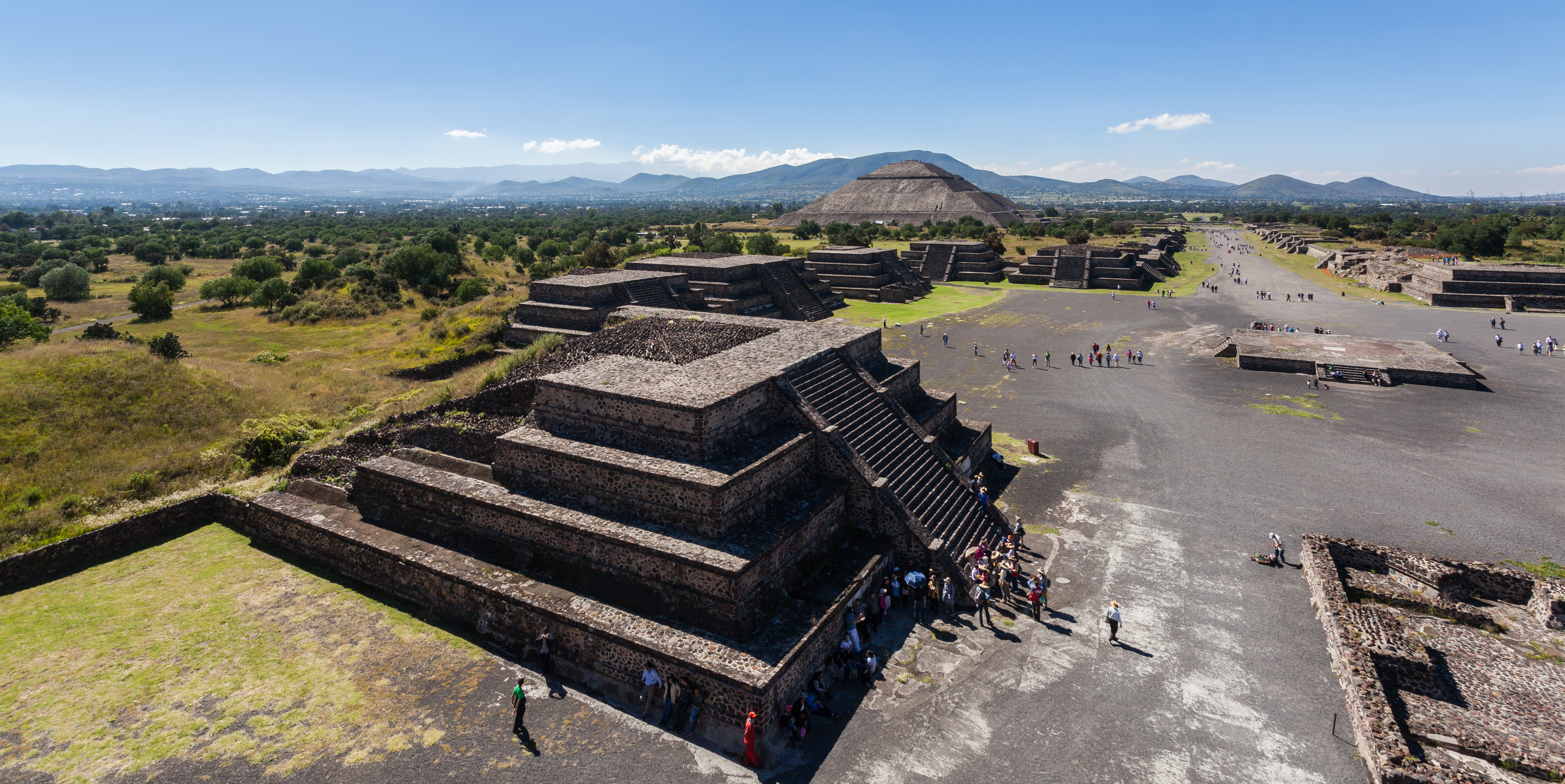
Avenue of the Dead, Teotihuacán, Mexico.

It was mentioned that the underground passage runs under Feathered Serpent Temple, and the entrance is located a few metres away from the temple at the expected place, deliberately sealed with large boulders nearly 2,000 years ago. The hole that had appeared during the 2003 storms was not the actual entrance; a vertical shaft of almost 5 metres away is the access to the tunnel. At 14 metres deep, the entrance leads to a nearly 100-merer long corridor that ends in a series of underground galleries in the rock. After archeologists broke ground at the entrance of the tunnel, a staircase, and ladders that would allow easy access to the subterranean site were installed. Works advanced slowly and with painstaking care; excavating was done manually, with spades. Nearly 1,000 tons of soil and debris were removed from the tunnel. There were large spiral seashells, cat bones, pottery, fragments of human skin. The rich array of objects unearthed included: wooden masks covered with inlaid rock jade and quartz, elaborate necklaces, rings, greenstone crocodile teeth and human figurines, crystals shaped into eyes, beetle wings arranged in a box, sculptures of jaguars, and hundreds of metalized spheres. The mysterious globes lay in both the north and south chambers. Ranging from 40 to 130 millimetres, the balls have a core of clay and are covered with a yellow jarosite formed by the oxidation of pyrite. According to George Cowgill of Arizona State University, the spheres are a fascinating find: "Pyrite was certainly used by the Teotihuacanos and other ancient Mesoamerican societies. Originally, the spheres would have shown [sic] brilliantly. They are indeed unique, but I have no idea what they mean." All these artifacts were deposited deliberately and pointedly, as if in offering to appease the gods.

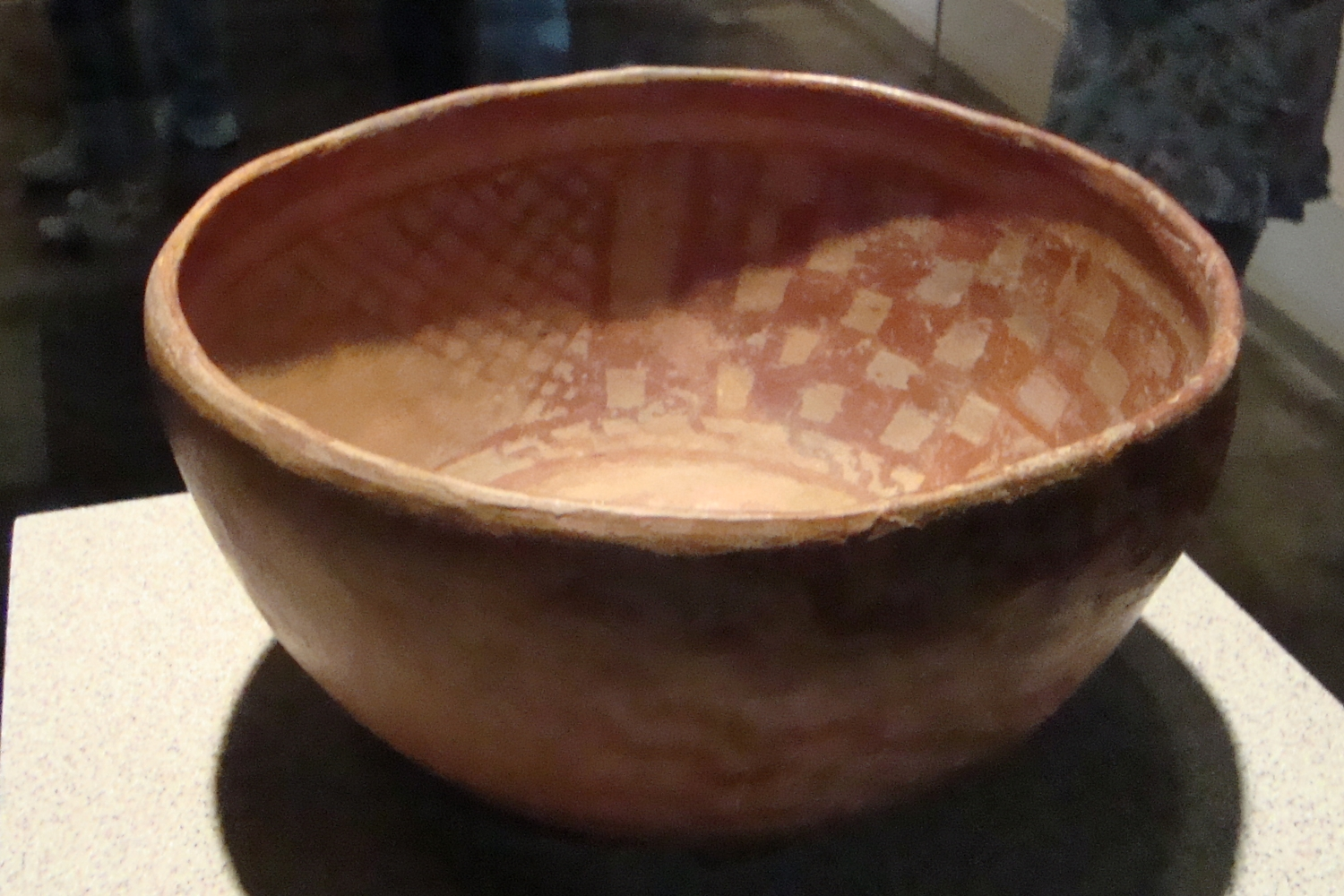
Vessel of the Coyotlatelco type.

One of the most remarkable findings in the tunnel chambers was a miniature mountainous landscape, 17 metres underground, with tiny pools of liquid mercury representing lakes. The walls and ceiling of the tunnel were found to have been carefully impregnated with mineral powder composed of magnetite, pyrite (fool's gold), and hematite to provide a glittering brightness to the complex, and to create the effect of standing under the stars as a peculiar re-creation of the underworld. At the end of the passage, Gómez Chávez's team uncovered four greenstone statues, wearing garments and beads; their open eyes would have shone with precious minerals. Two of the figurines were still in their original positions, leaning back and appearing to contemplate up at the axis where the three planes of the universe meet – likely the founding shamans of Teotihuacan, guiding pilgrims to the sanctuary, and carrying bundles of sacred objects used to perform rituals, including pendants and pyrite mirrors, which were perceived as portals to other realms.

After each new segment was cleared, the 3D scanner documented the progress. By 2015 nearly 75,000 fragments of artifacts have been discovered, studied, cataloged, analyzed and, when possible, restored.

The significance of these new discoveries is publicly explored in a major exhibition at the De Young Museum in San Francisco, which opened in late September 2017.

A recent discovery of an 1800-year-old bouquet of flowers was made in 2021. The flowers, which were found in the tunnel beneath a pyramid dedicated to the feathered serpent deity Quetzalcóatl, date to between roughly 1 and 200 C.E. It is the first time such a well-preserved plant matter has been discovered at Teotihuacan.

==== Monuments of Teotihuacan ====
The city of Teotihuacan was characterized by large and imposing buildings, which included, apart from the complexes of houses, temples, large squares, stadiums, and palaces of the rulers, nobles, and priests. The city's urban-ceremonial space is considered one of the most impressive achievements of the pre-Columbian New World. The size and quality of the monuments, the originality of the residential architecture, and the impressive iconography in the colored murals of the buildings or the vases with the paintings of butterflies, eagles, coyotes with feathers and jaguars, but rarely human figures, suggest beyond any doubt a high-level civilization, whose cultural influences were spread and influenced far beyond, what is now, Central Mexico. The main monuments of the city of Teotihuacan are connected to each other by a central road of 45 meters wide and a length of 2 kilometers, called "Avenue of the Dead " (Avenida de Los Muertos), which features a number of temples and grand residences. East is the imposing "Pyramid of the Sun " (Piramide del Sol), the third-largest pyramid in the world. It has an interior volume of more than 1 million cubic meters. It is a gradual pyramid, with a base dimension of 219.4 x 231.6 meters and a height of 65 meters. At the top of the pyramid, there was a huge pedestal, where human sacrifices were made. At the north end of the city, the Boulevard of the dead ends in the "Pyramid of the Moon " (Piramide de la Luna), the second largest of the temples in the complex. It is surrounded laterally by platforms-ramps and lower pyramids. In the southern part is the "Temple of Cetzalkokal" (Quetzalcoatl), dedicated to God in the form of a winged serpent, which gives life and fertility. Sculpture representation of the God in contrasting aspects of war and fertility adorn the two sides of the uphill scale of the temple.

=== Site layout ===
The city's broad central avenue, called "Avenue of the Dead" (a translation from its Nahuatl name Miccaotli), is flanked by impressive ceremonial architecture, including the immense Pyramid of the Sun (third largest in the world after the Great Pyramid of Cholula and the Great Pyramid of Giza). Pyramid of the Moon and The Ciudadela with Temple of the Feathered Serpent are placed at both ends of the Avenue while Palace-museum Quetzalpapálot, the fourth basic structure of the site, is situated between two main pyramids. Along the Avenue are many smaller talud-tablero platforms as well. The Aztecs believed they were tombs, inspiring the name of the avenue. Scholars have now established that these were ceremonial platforms that were topped with temples.

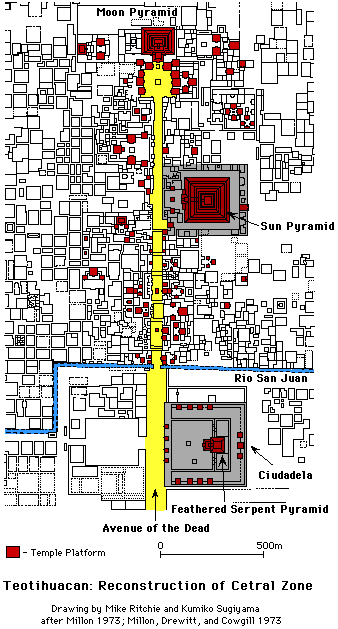
A recreation of a map of a portion of the city featured in the June 1967 issue of Scientific American and the captioned source.

The Avenue of the Dead is roughly 40 meters wide and 4 km long. Further down the Avenue of the Dead, after a small river, is the area known as the Citadel, containing the ruined Temple of the Feathered Serpent Quetzalcoatl. This area was a large plaza surrounded by temples that formed the religious and political center of the city. The name "Citadel" was given to it by the Spanish, who believed it was a fort. Most of the common people lived in large apartment buildings spread across the city. Many of the buildings contained workshops where artisans produced pottery and other goods.

The urban layout of Teotihuacan exhibits two slightly different orientations, which resulted from both astronomical and topographic criteria. The central part of the city, including the Avenue of the Dead, conforms to the orientation of the Sun Pyramid, while the southern part reproduces the orientation of the Ciudadela. The two constructions recorded sunrises and sunsets on particular dates, allowing the use of an observational calendar. The orientation of the Sun Pyramid was intended to record "the sunrises on February 11 and October 29 and sunsets on April 30 and August 13. The interval from February 11 and October 29, as well as from August 13 to April 30, is exactly 260 days". The recorded intervals are multiples of 13 and 20 days, which were elementary periods of the Mesoamerican calendar. Furthermore, the Sun Pyramid is aligned to Cerro Gordo to the north, which means that it was purposefully built on a spot where a structure with a rectangular ground plan could satisfy both topographic and astronomical requirements. The artificial cave under the pyramid additionally attests to the importance of this spot.

Another example of artificial landscape modifications is the course of the San Juan River, which was modified to bend around the structures as it goes through the center of town eventually returning to its natural course outside of Teotihuacan.

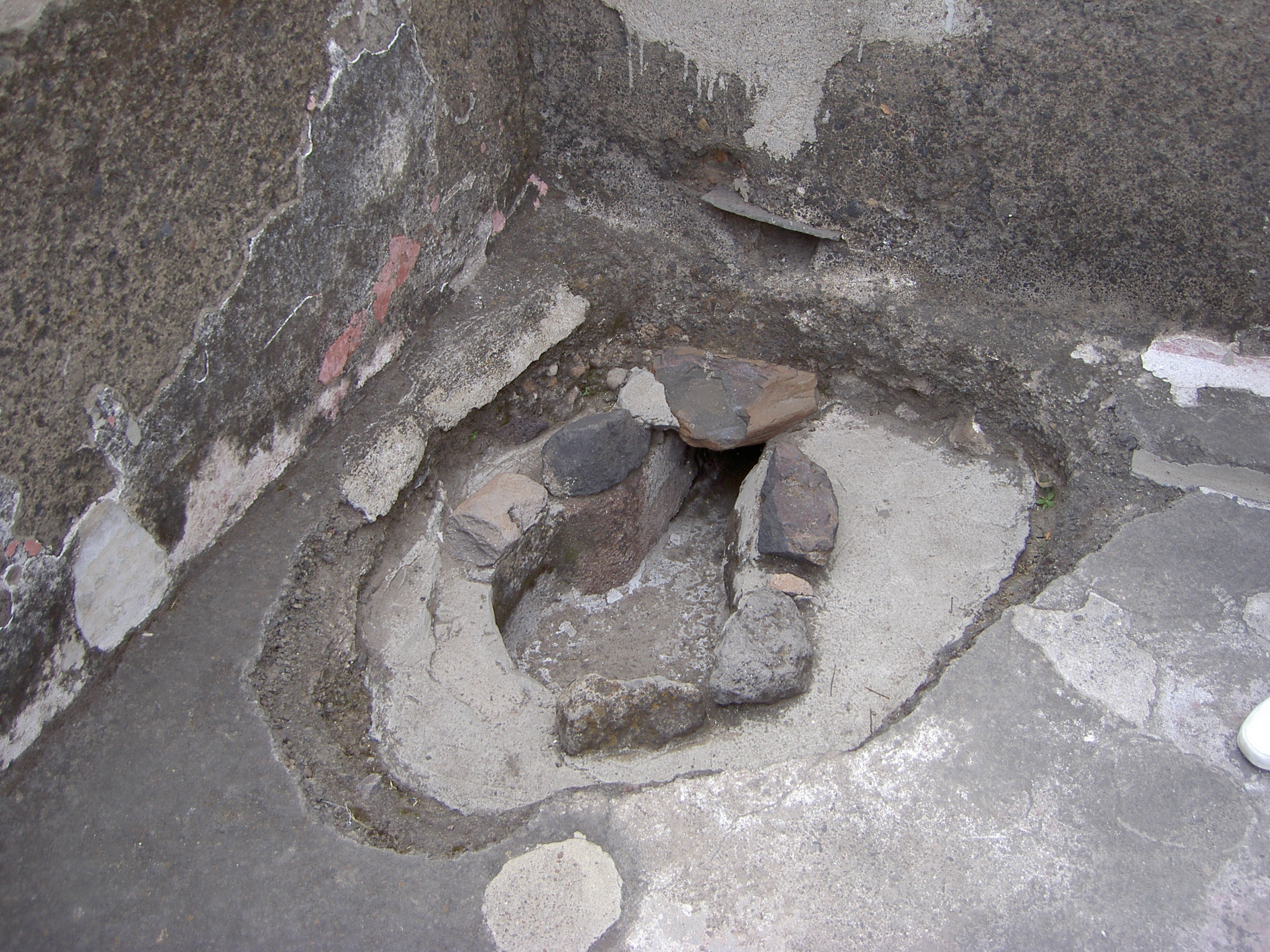
Toilet in Teotihuacan.

Pecked-cross circles throughout the city and in the surrounding regions served as a way to design the urban grid, and as a way to read their 260-day calendar. The urban grid had great significance to city planners when constructing Teotihuacan, as the cross is pecked into the ground in the Pyramid of the Sun in specific places throughout Teotihuacan in precise degrees and angles over three km in distance. The layout of these crosses suggests it was there to work as a grid to the layout of Teotihuacan because they are laid out in a rectangular shape facing the Avenue of the Dead. The direction of the axes of the crosses do not point to an astronomical North and South direction but instead point to their own city's North. Numerology also has significance in the cross pecking because of the placement and amount of the holes, which sometimes count to 260 days, the length of the ritual calendrical cycle. Some of the pecked-cross circles also resemble an ancient Aztec game called, patolli.

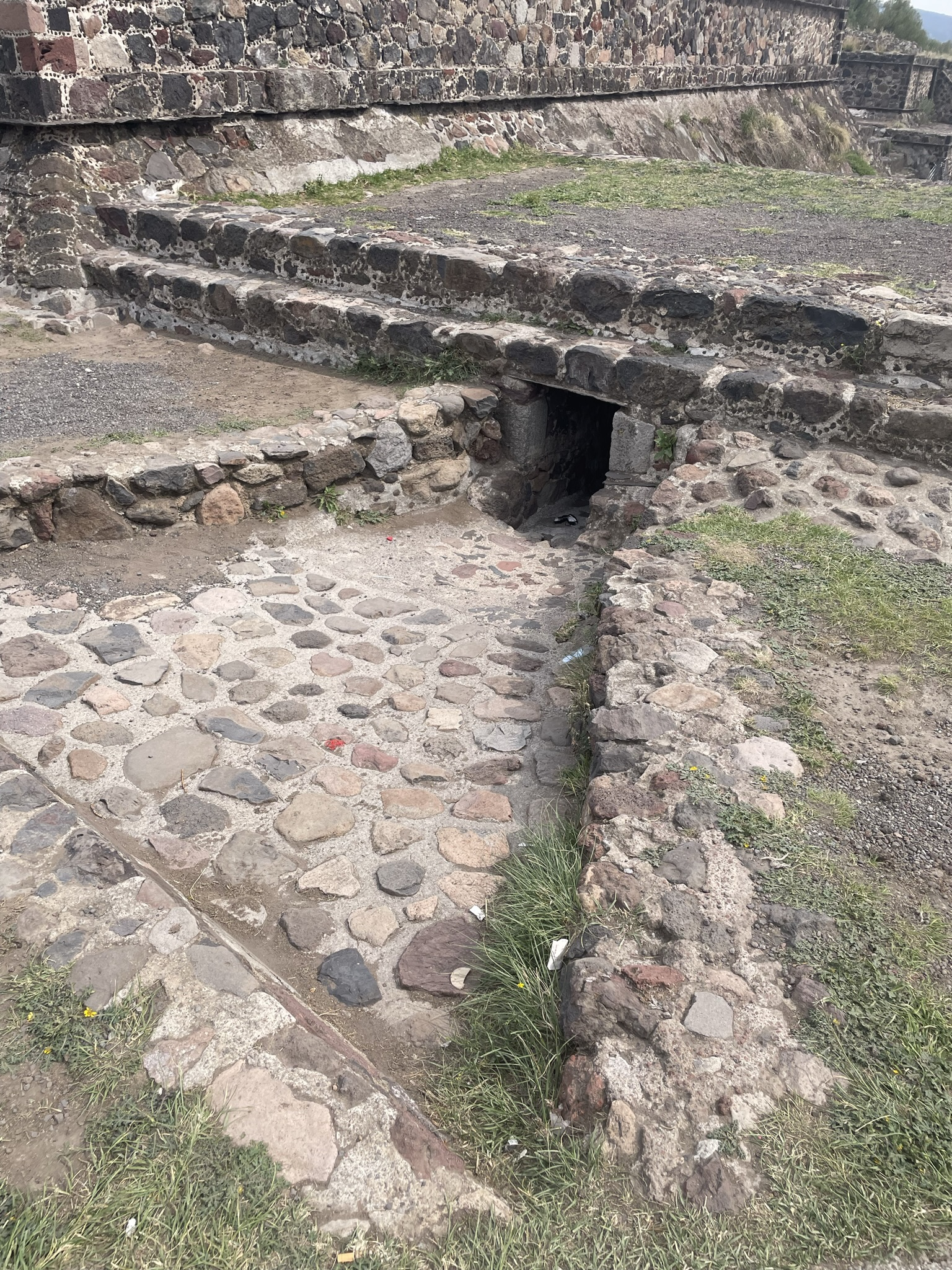
A tunnel under steps in the Great Compound along the Avenue of the Dead.

These pecked-cross circles can be found not just in Teotihuacan, but also throughout Mesoamerica. The ones found all share certain similarities. These include having the shape of two circles, one being inside of the other. They are all found pecked on the ground or onto rocks. They are all created with a small hammer-like device that produces cuplike markings that are 1 centimeter in diameter and 2 centimeters apart. They all have axes that are in line with the city structures of the region. Because they are aligned with the structures of the cities, they also align with the position of significant astronomical bodies.

The Ciudadela was completed during the Miccaotli phase, and the Pyramid of the Sun underwent a complex series of additions and renovations. The Great Compound was constructed across the Avenue of the Dead, west of Ciudadela. This was probably the city's marketplace. The existence of a large market in an urban center of this size is strong evidence of state organization. Teotihuacan was at that point simply too large and too complex to have been politically viable as a chiefdom.

The Ciudadela is a great enclosed plaza capable of holding 100,000 people. About 700,000 cubic meters (yards) of material were used to construct its buildings. Its central feature is the Temple of Quetzalcoatl, which was flanked by upper-class apartments. The entire compound was designed to overwhelm visitors.

== Contemporary issues ==
=== Threat from development ===
The archeological park of Teotihuacan is under threat from development pressures. In 2004, the governor of Mexico state, Arturo Montiel, gave permission for Wal-Mart to build a large store in the third archeological zone of the park. According to Sergio Gómez Chávez, an archeologist and researcher for Mexico's National Institute of Anthropology and History (INAH) fragments of ancient pottery were found where trucks dumped the soil from the site.

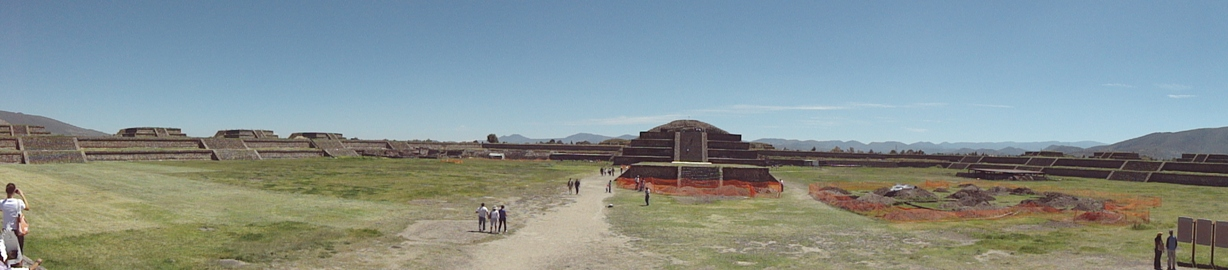
The Ciudadela, on the opposite side from the Pyramid of the Moon

More recently, Teotihuacan has become the center of controversy over Resplandor Teotihuacan, a massive light and sound spectacular installed to create a nighttime show for tourists. Critics explain that a large number of perforations for the project have caused fractures in stones and irreversible damage, while the project will have limited benefit.

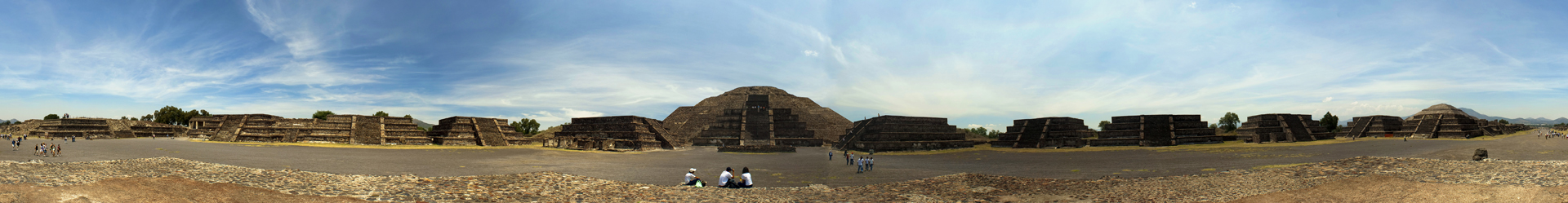
360° View of the Avenue of the Dead, the Pyramid of the Sun and the Pyramid of the Moon
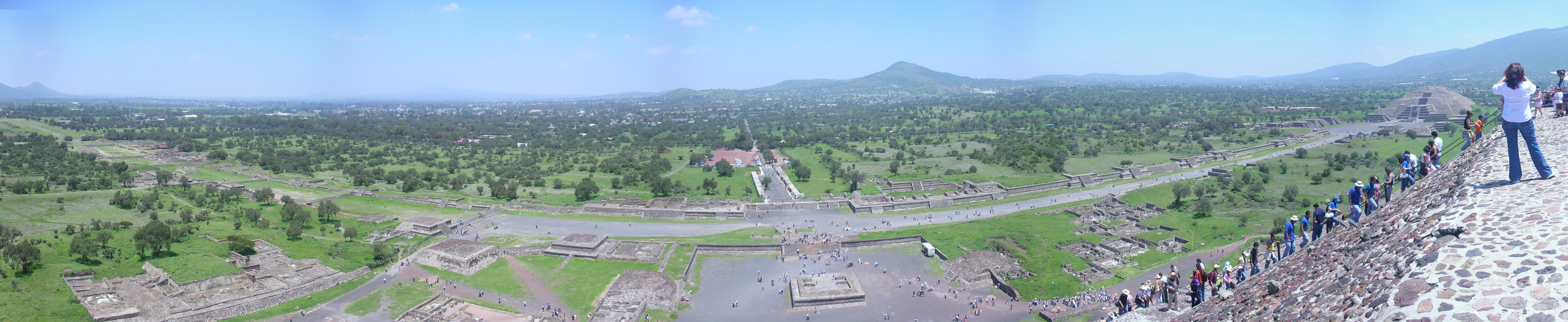
Panoramic view from the summit of the Pyramid of the Sun, with the Pyramid of the Moon in the distance
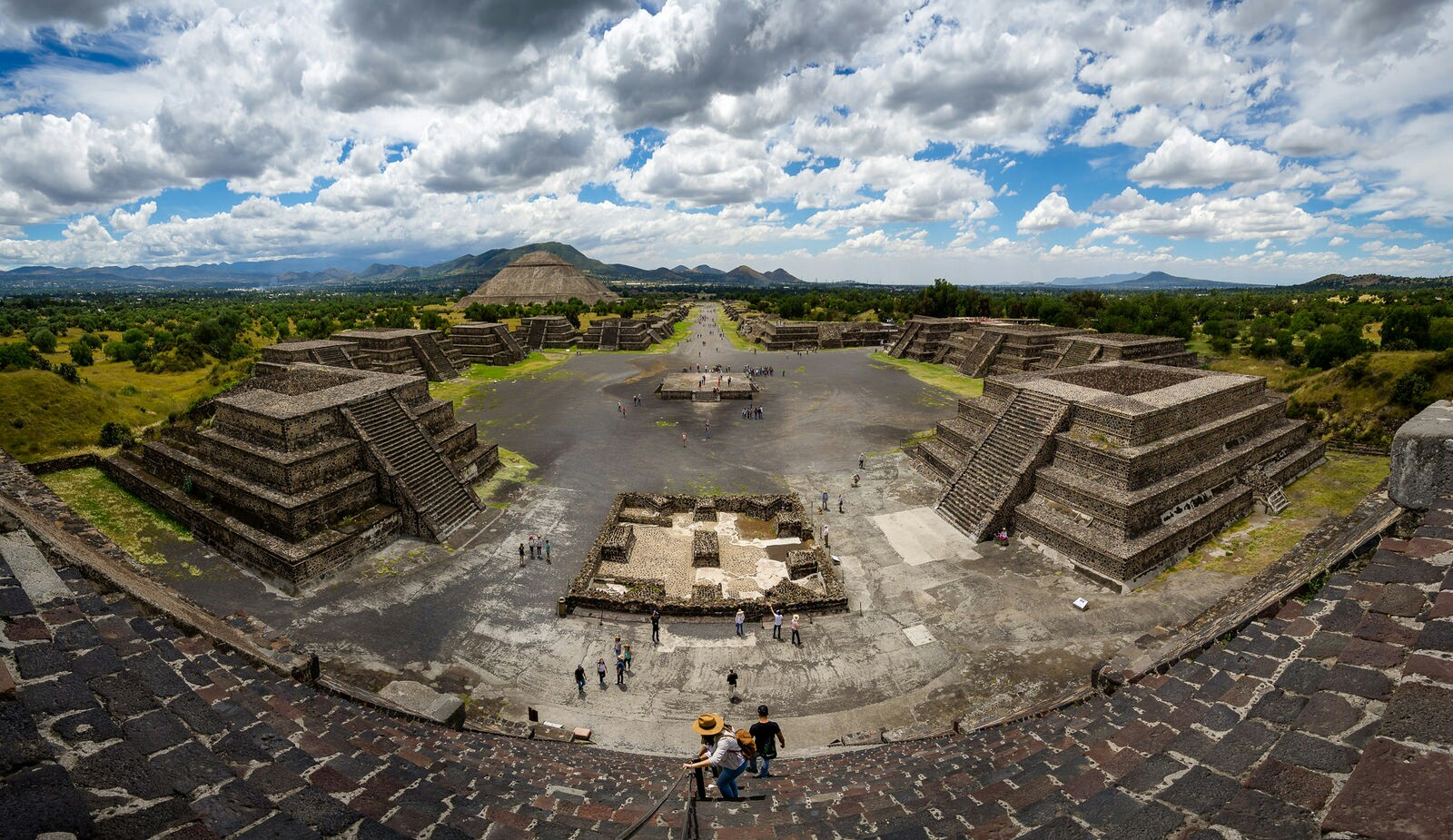
Panoramic view from the summit of the Pyramid of the Moon, with the Pyramid of the Sun on the center left.

In May 2021, the Secretariat of Culture announced that a construction crew had been bulldozing the northern outskirts of the city ruins in order to develop the land for an amusement park, despite three-months worth of orders from the government to stop work. The report detailed that at least 25 archeological structures were in immediate danger.

==== Mexican government response ====
On May 31, 2021, 250 National Guard troops and 60 agents of the Attorney General's Office were sent to the Teotihuacán site to seize parcels of land intended for illegal construction and to forcibly stop further destruction of historical sites. The National Institute of Anthropology and History (INAH) had suspended authorization for those projects in March, yet construction work with heavy machinery and looting of artifacts had continued. The seizure of the land came a week after the International Council on Monuments and Sites (ICOMOS) warned that Teotihuacán was at risk of losing its UNESCO World Heritage designation.

=== Shooting ===
On 20 April 2026, a gunman shot and killed a Canadian woman and wounded several others before killing himself at the pyramids.

== Gallery ==
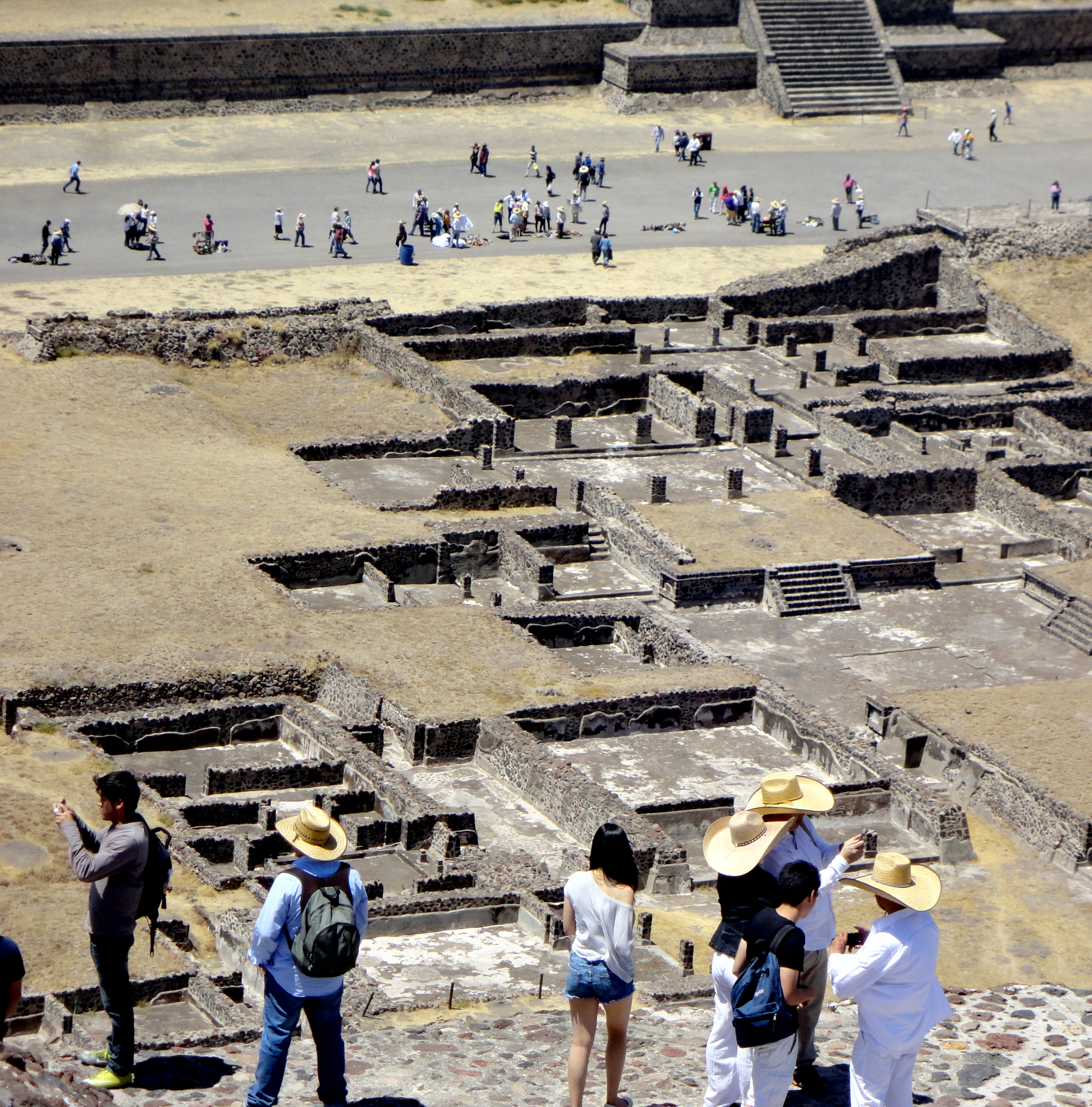
View from the Pyramid of the Sun

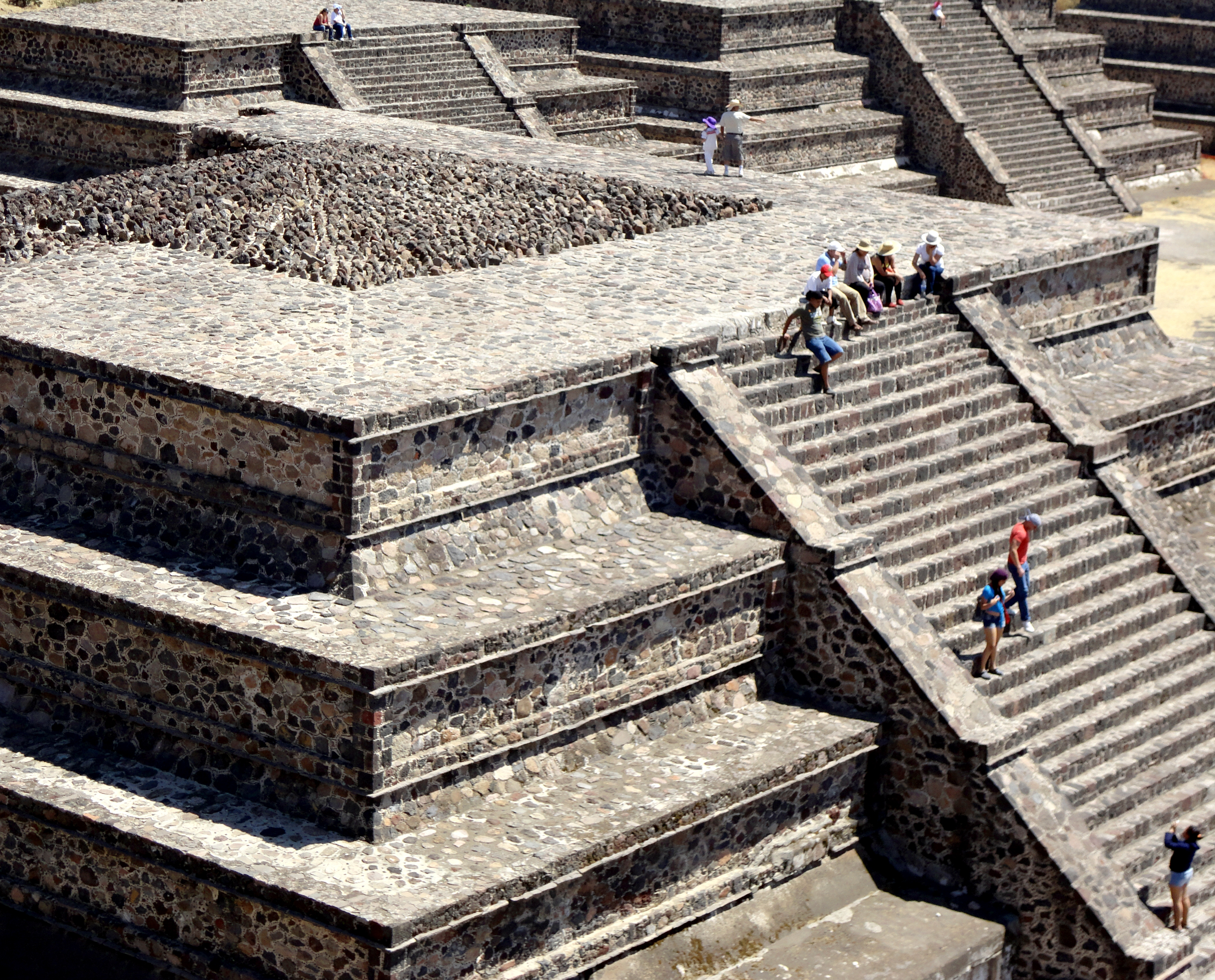
View from the Pyramid of the Moon

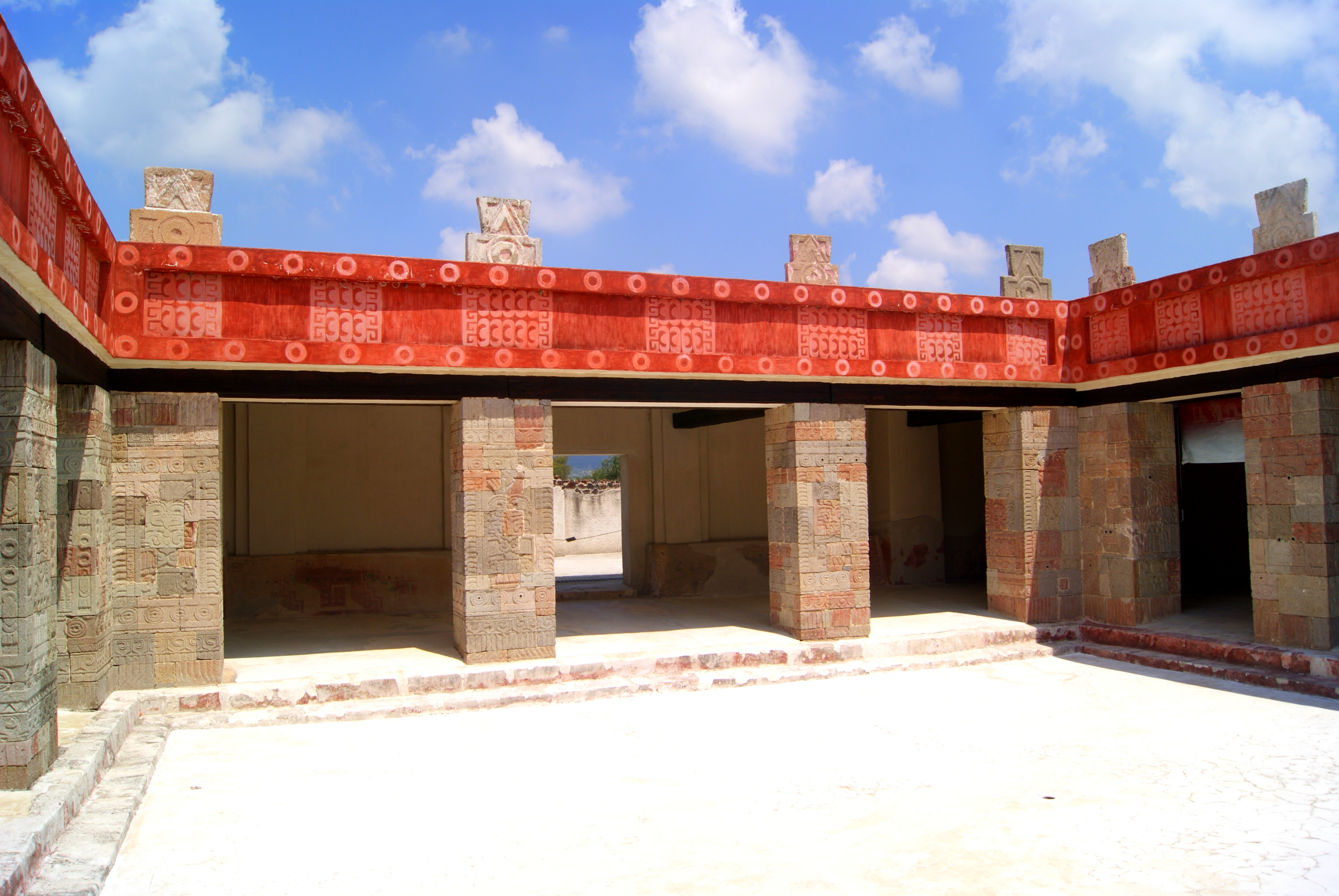
Courtyard of the Palace of Quetzalpapálotl

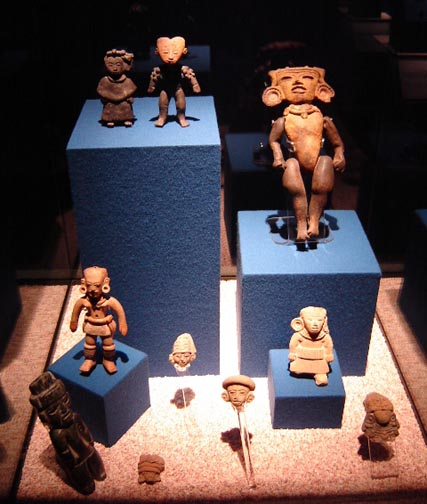
Figurines at the local museum

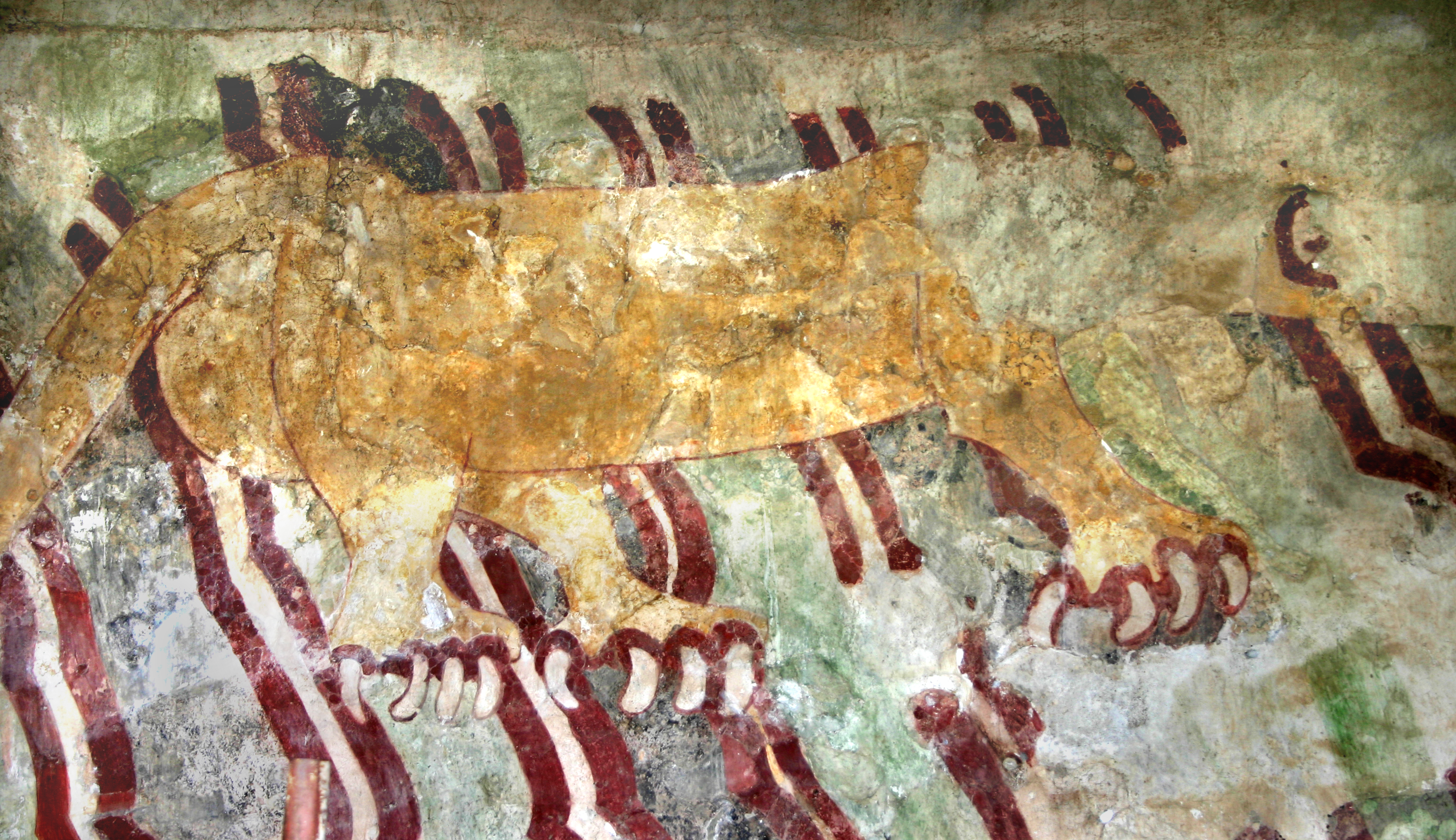
Puma mural in the Avenue of the Dead

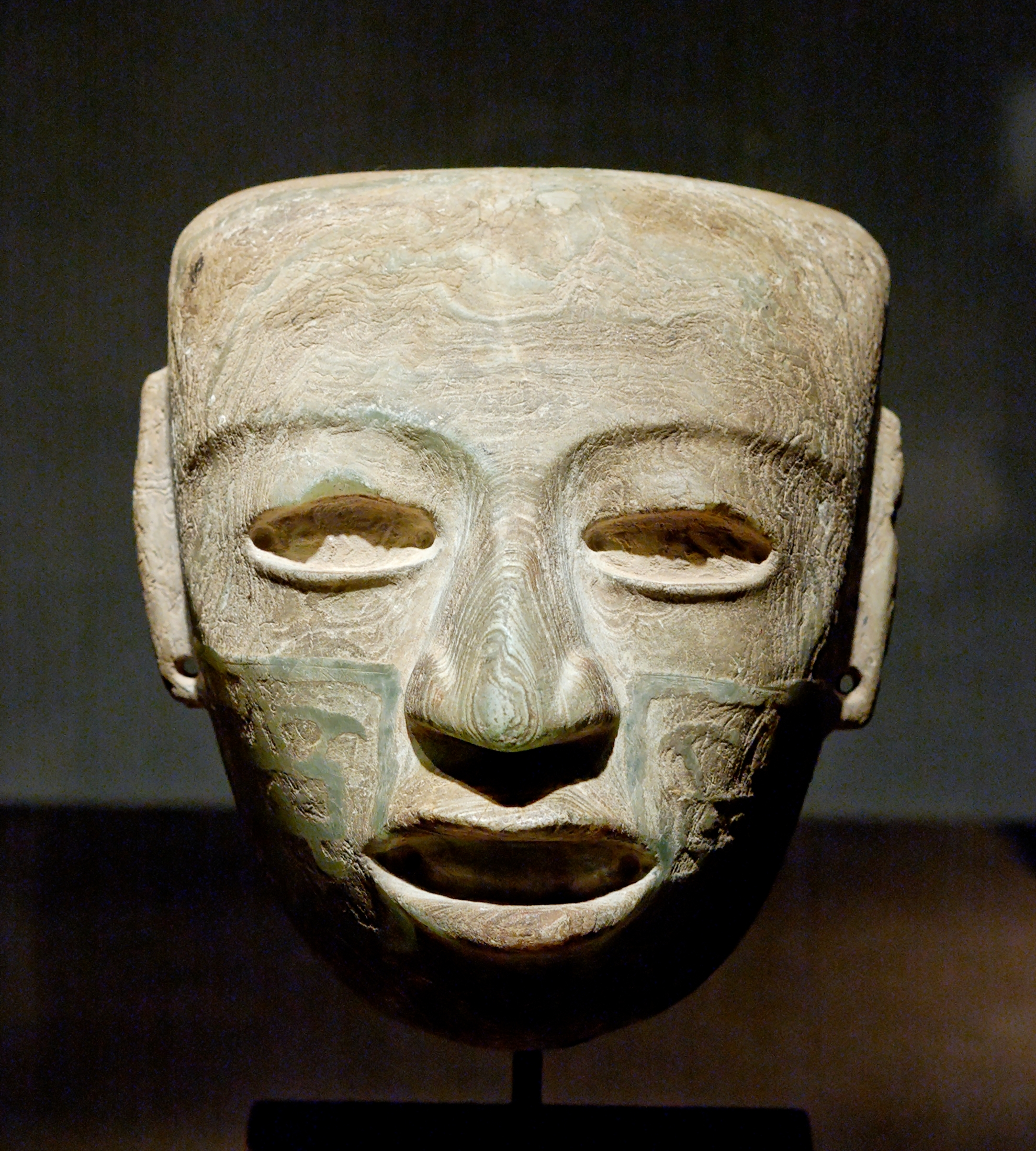
Marble mask, 3rd–7th centuries

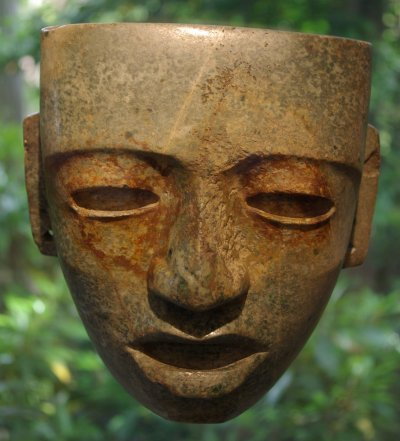
Serpentine mask, 3rd–6th centuries

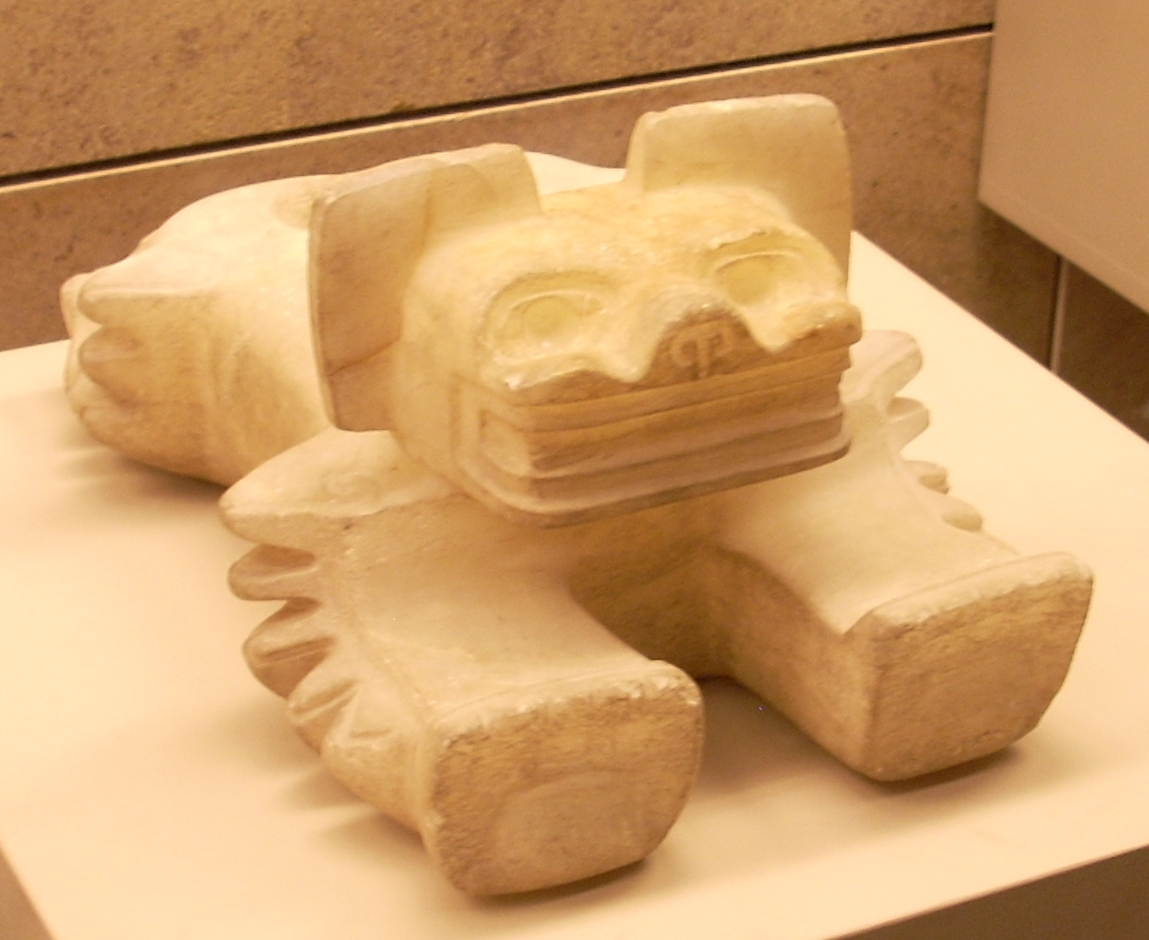
Alabaster statue of an ocelot from Teotihuacan, 5th–6th centuries, possibly a ritual container to receive sacrificed human hearts (British Museum)

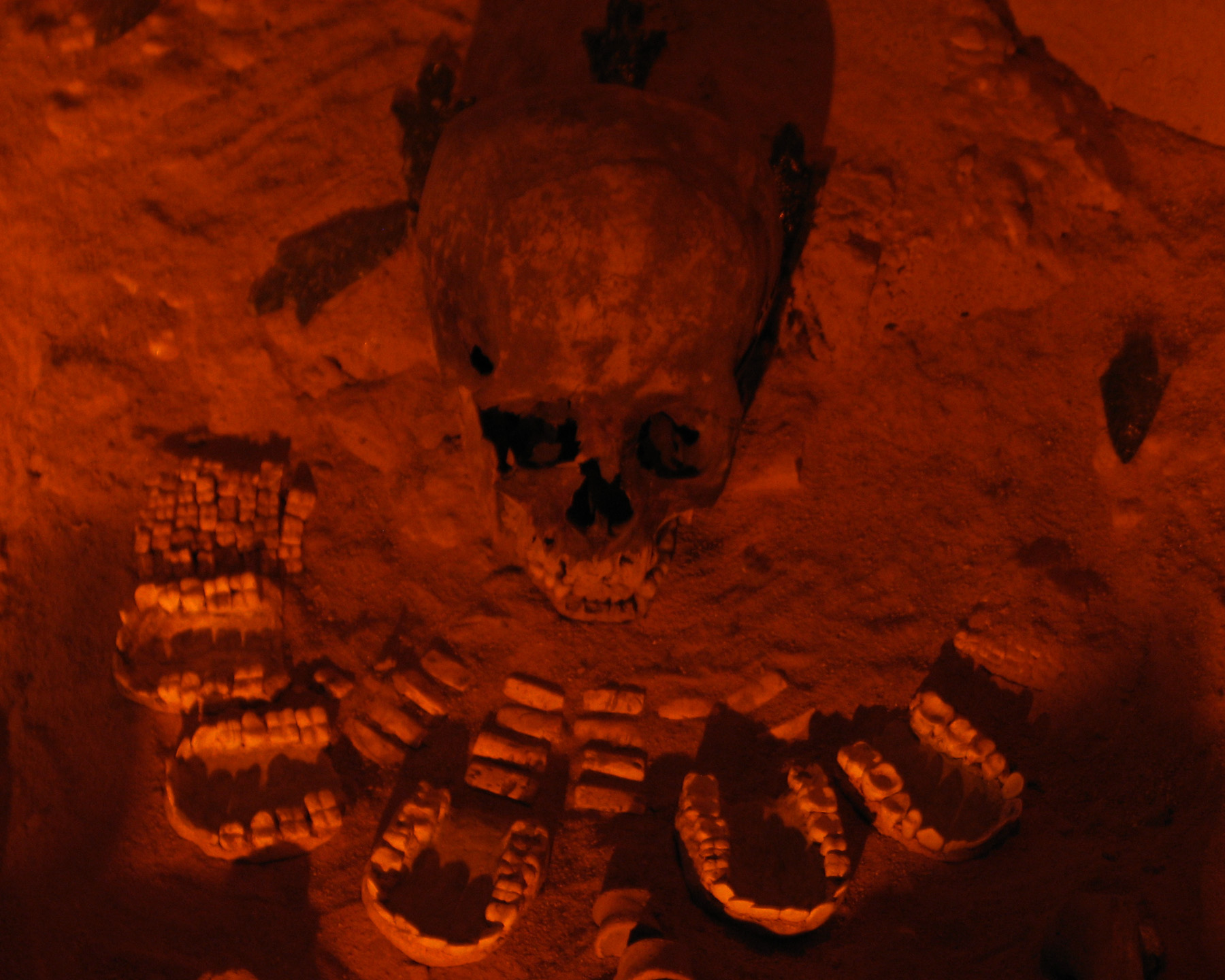
Detail of a collective burial of those sacrificed humans as part of the rites of consecration for the Pyramid of the Feathered Serpent (phase Miccaotli, c. AD 200) In this case, all buried bodies had their hands tied behind their backs. The necklace is made of pieces that simulate human jaws, but other subjects buried wore necklaces with actual jaws.

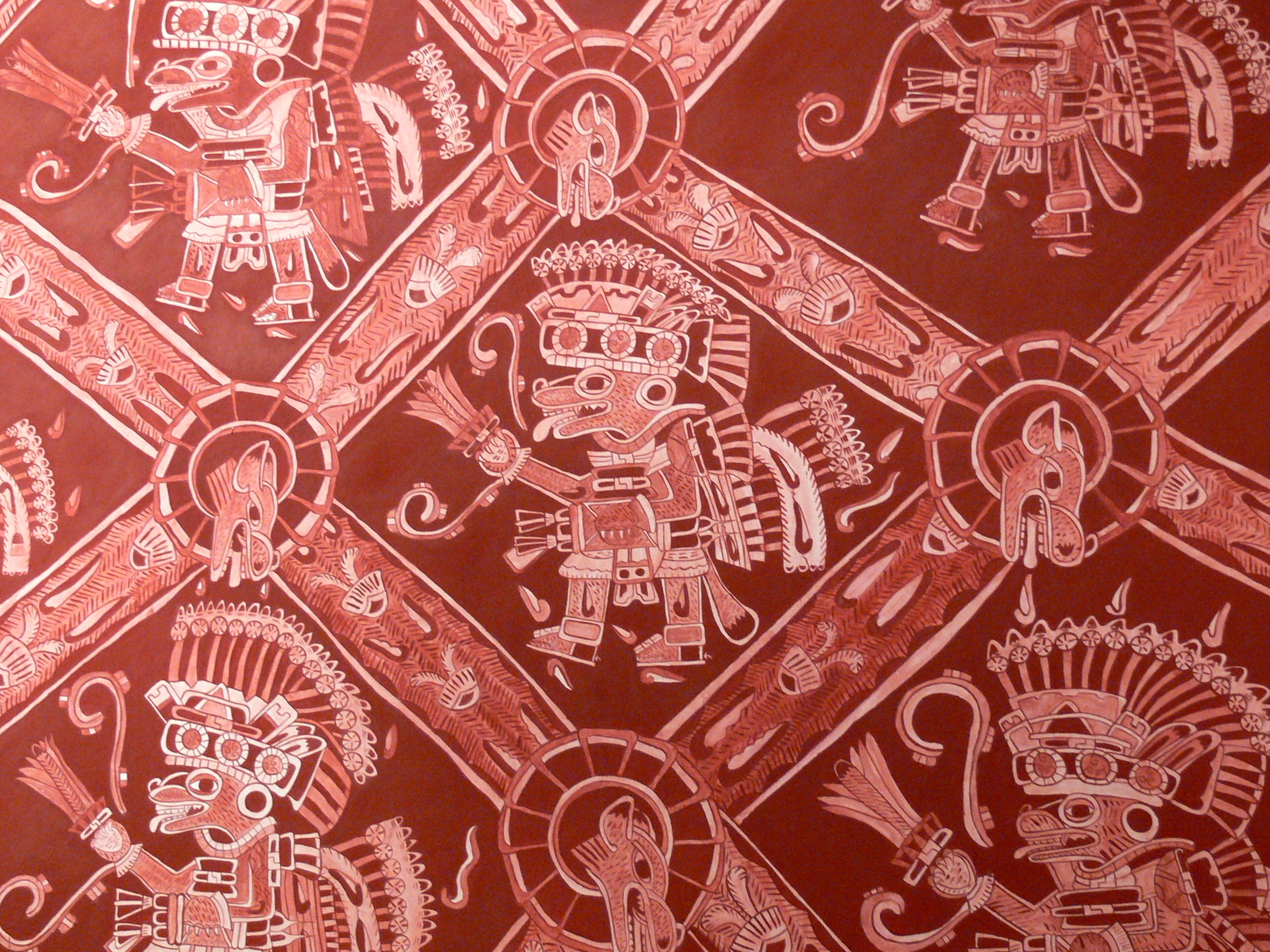
Detail of the murals of the palace of Atetelco, dated in Xolalpan phase (c. 450–650).

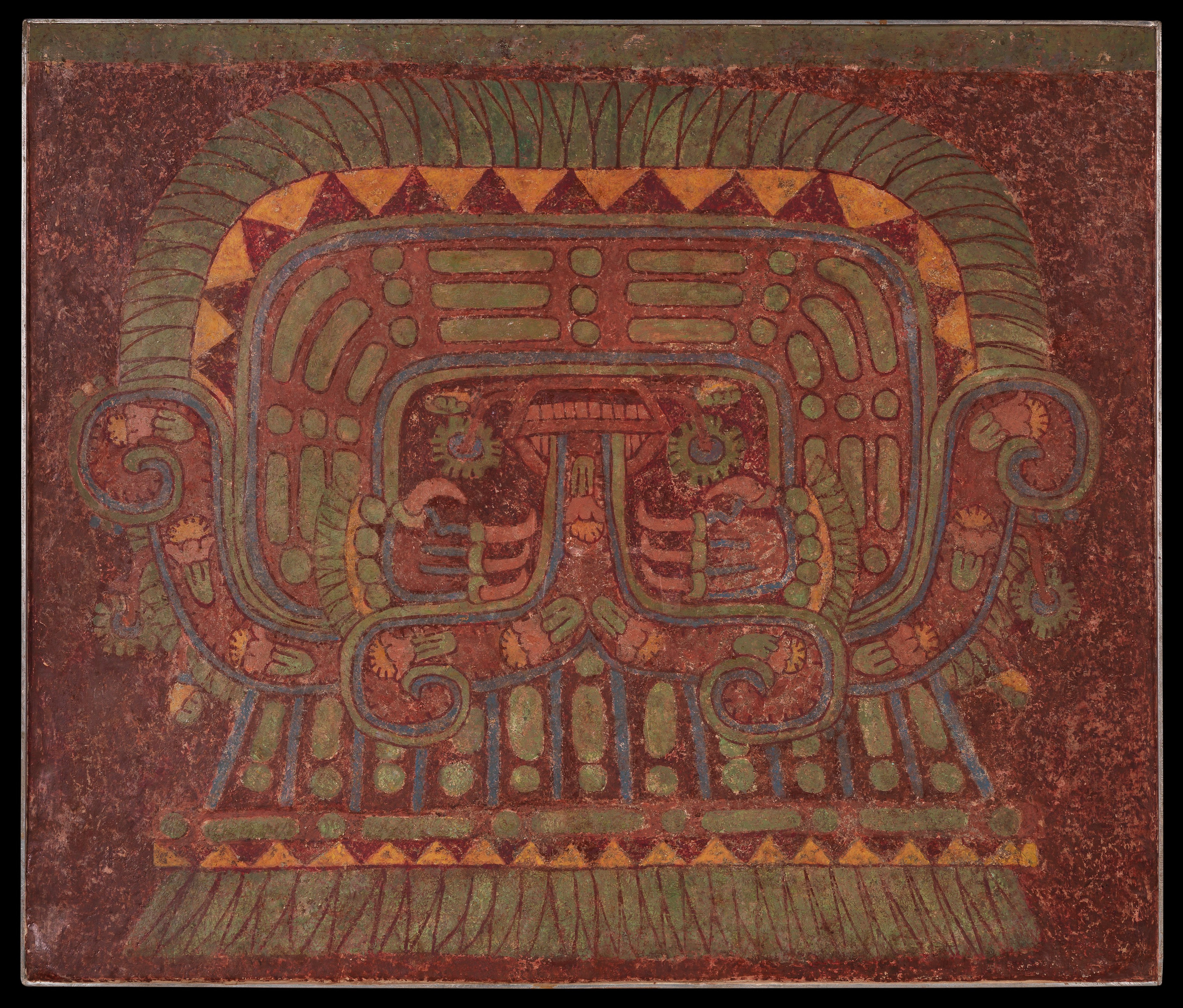
A wall painting in Teotihuacan

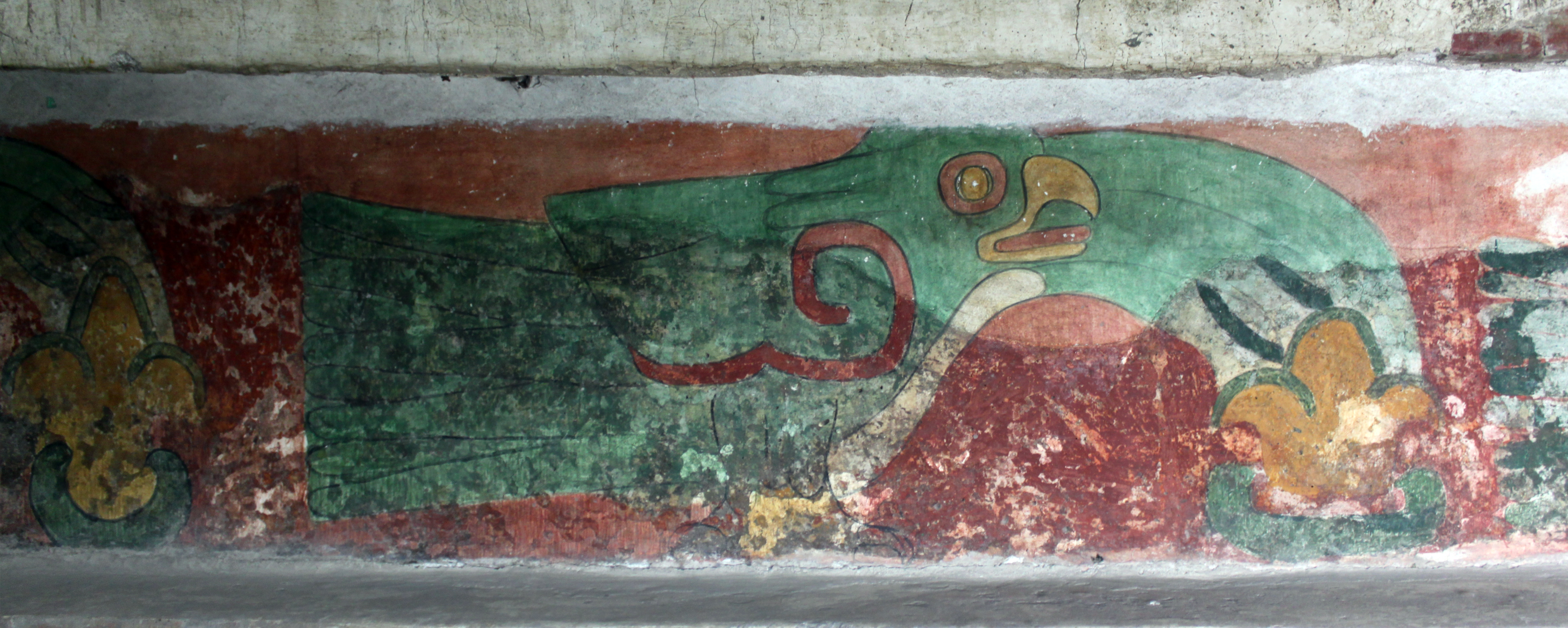
Green Bird Procession, Temple of the Feathered Serpents

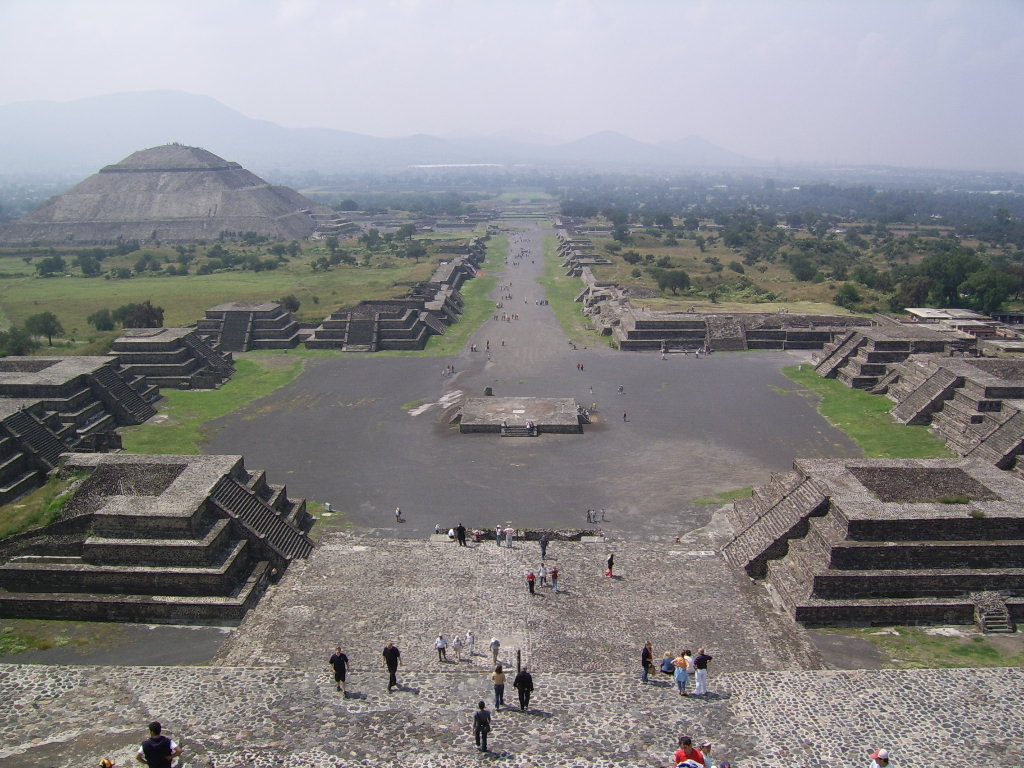
From Pyramid of the Moon

== See also ==
- Asteroid 293477 Teotihuacan
- Cerro de la Estrella, a large Teotihuacano-styled pyramid in what is now part of Mexico City
- List of archaeoastronomical sites by country
- List of megalithic sites
- List of Mesoamerican pyramids
- List of World Heritage Sites in Mexico
- Robert E. Lee Chadwick, an American anthropologist and archeologist
- Spring equinox in Teotihuacán
- Giza pyramid complex
