= Column =

Structural element that transmits weight from above to below

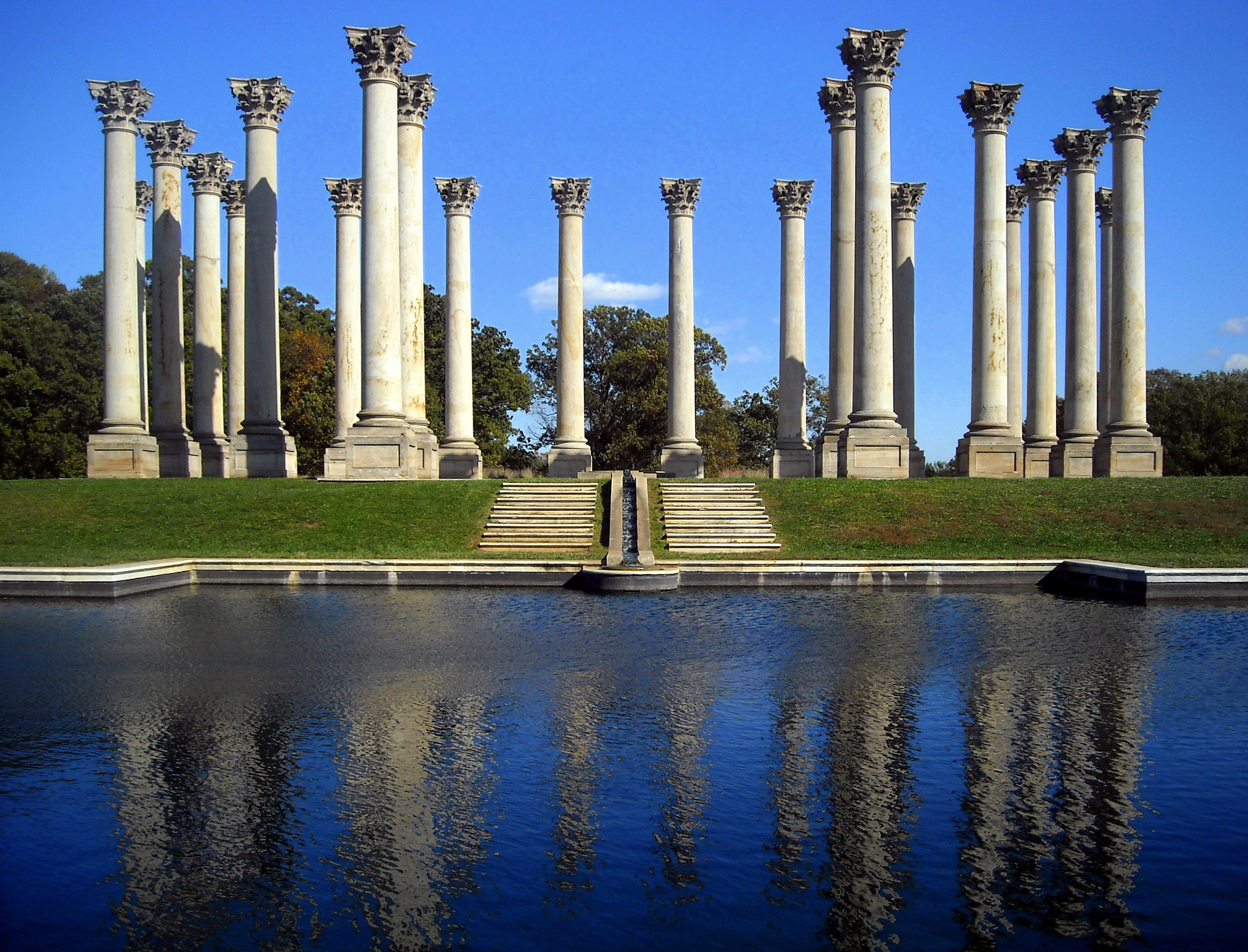
National Capitol Columns at the United States National Arboretum. Corinthian columns, load-bearing in their original placements on the US Capitol

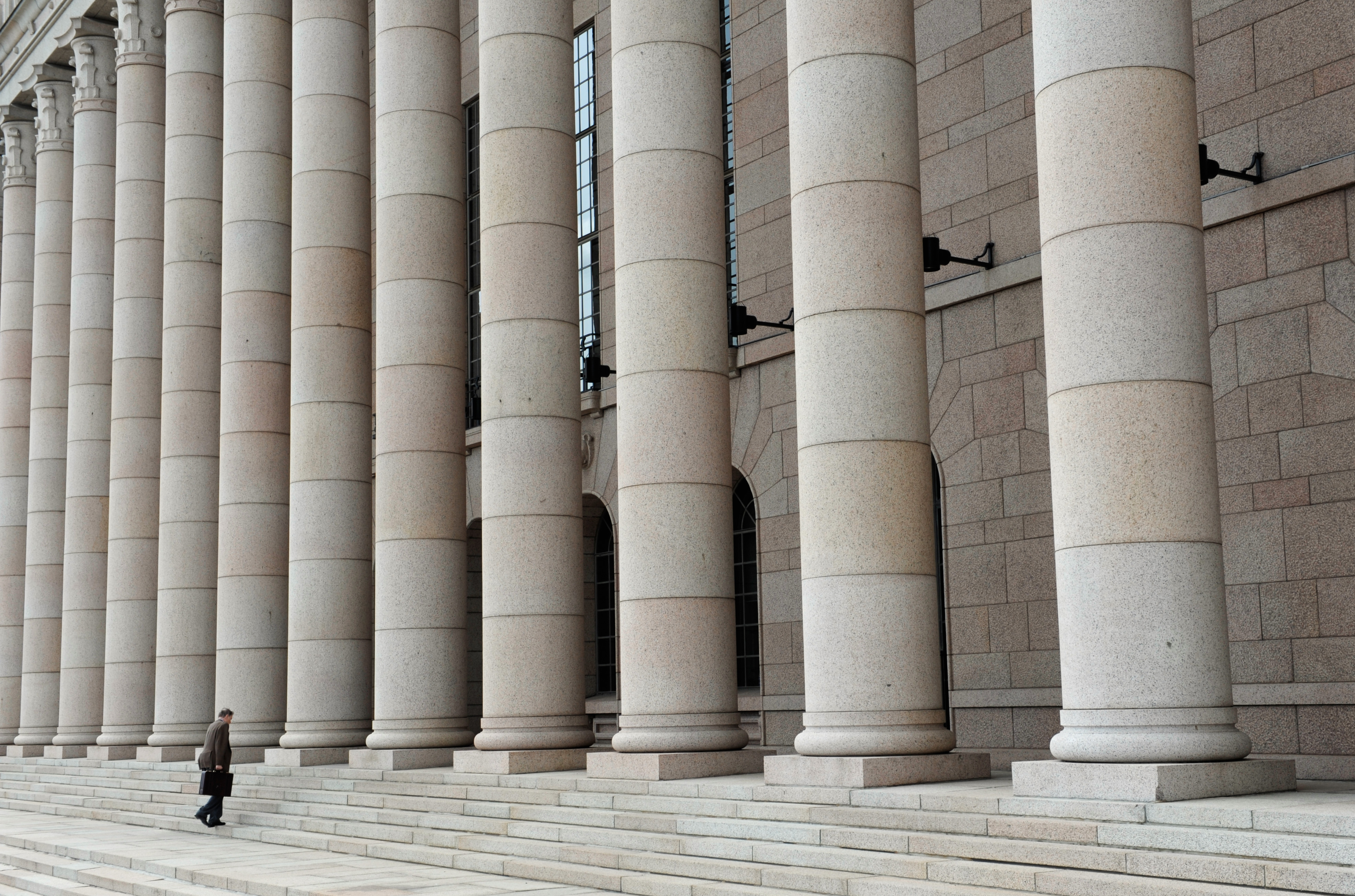
Columns of the Parliament House in Helsinki, Finland

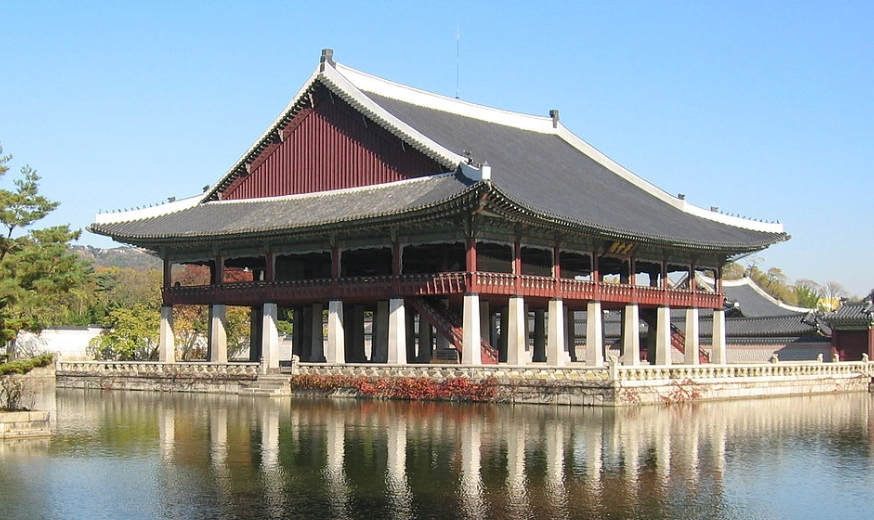
All the columns on the first floor of Gyeonghoeru in Seoul, Korea, are made of granite.

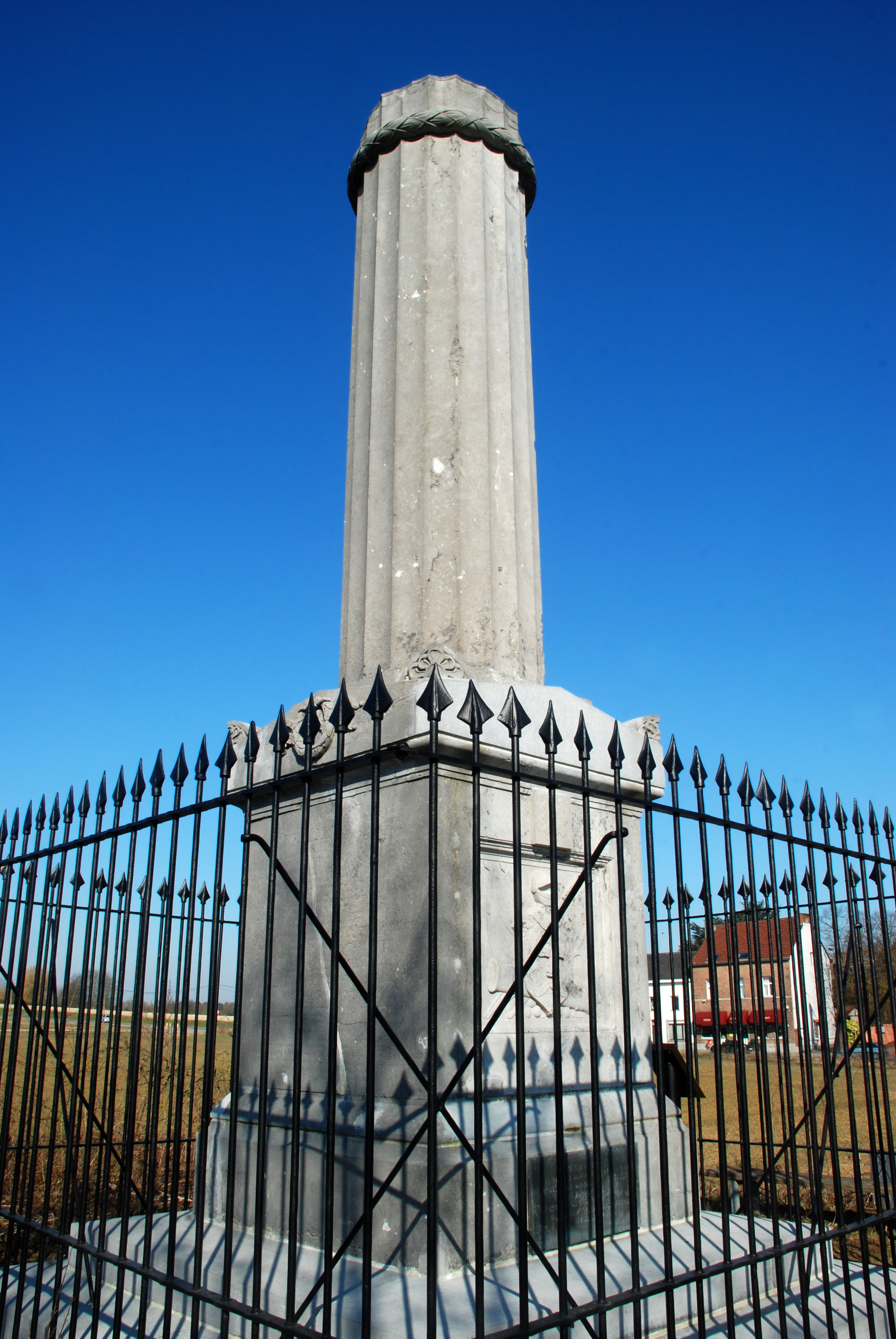
Column of the Gordon Monument in Waterloo

A column/pillar in architecture and structural engineering is a structural element that transmits, through compression, the weight of the structure above to other structural elements below. In other words, a column is a compression member. The term column applies especially to a large round support (the shaft of the column) with a capital and a base or pedestal, which is made of stone, or appearing to be so. A small wooden or metal support is typically called a post. Supports with a rectangular or other non-round section are usually called piers. Throughout architectural history, especially in Classical and Rennaisance styles, the column has been central to building design.

For the purpose of wind or earthquake engineering, columns may be designed to resist lateral forces. Other compression members are often termed "columns" because of the similar stress conditions. Columns are frequently used to support beams or arches on which the upper parts of walls or ceilings rest. In architecture, "column" refers to such a structural element that also has certain proportional and decorative features. These columns are available in a broad selection of styles and designs in round tapered, round straight, or square shaft styles. A column might also be a decorative element not needed for structural purposes; many columns are engaged, that is to say form part of a wall. A long sequence of columns joined by an entablature is known as a colonnade. In Classical architecture, columns have historically had a few different "orders", notably the Doric, Ionic, Corinthian, Tuscan, Composite, and Solomonic.

== History ==
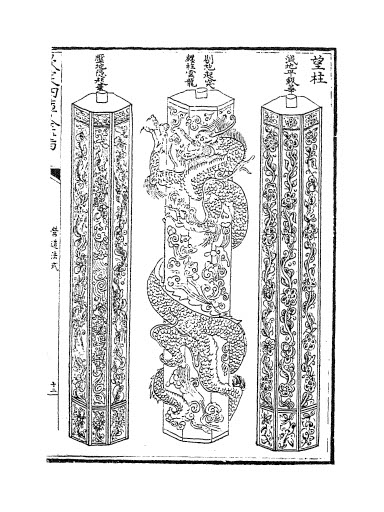
Dragon pillar from the Yingzao Fashi, Song dynasty

=== Antiquity ===
All significant Iron Age civilizations of the Near East and Mediterranean made some use of columns.

==== Egyptian ====
In ancient Egyptian architecture as early as 2600 BC, the architect Imhotep made use of stone columns whose surface was carved to reflect the organic form of bundled reeds, like papyrus, lotus and palm. In later Egyptian architecture faceted cylinders were also common. Their form is thought to derive from archaic reed-built shrines. Carved from stone, the columns were highly decorated with carved and painted hieroglyphs, texts, ritual imagery and natural motifs. Egyptian columns are famously present in the Great Hypostyle Hall of Karnak (c. 1224 BC), where 134 columns are lined up in sixteen rows, with some columns reaching heights of 24 metres.

One of the most important type are the papyriform columns. The origin of these columns goes back to the 5th Dynasty. They are composed of lotus (papyrus) stems which are drawn together into a bundle decorated with bands: the capital, instead of opening out into the shape of a bellflower, swells out and then narrows again like a flower in bud. The base, which tapers to take the shape of a half-sphere like the stem of the lotus, has a continuously recurring decoration of stipules.

Examples of Egyptian columns

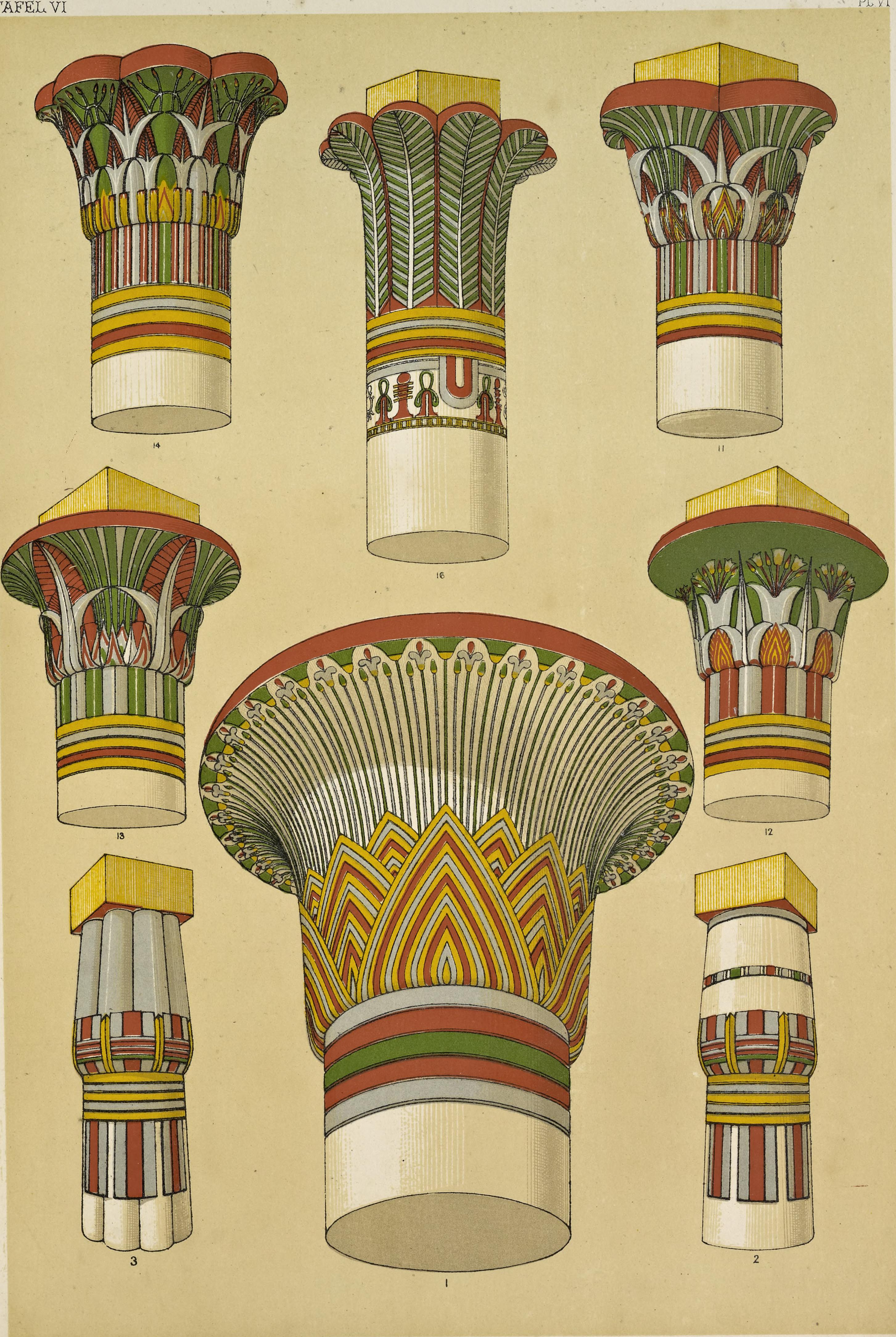
Illustration of papyriform capitals, in The Grammar of Ornament

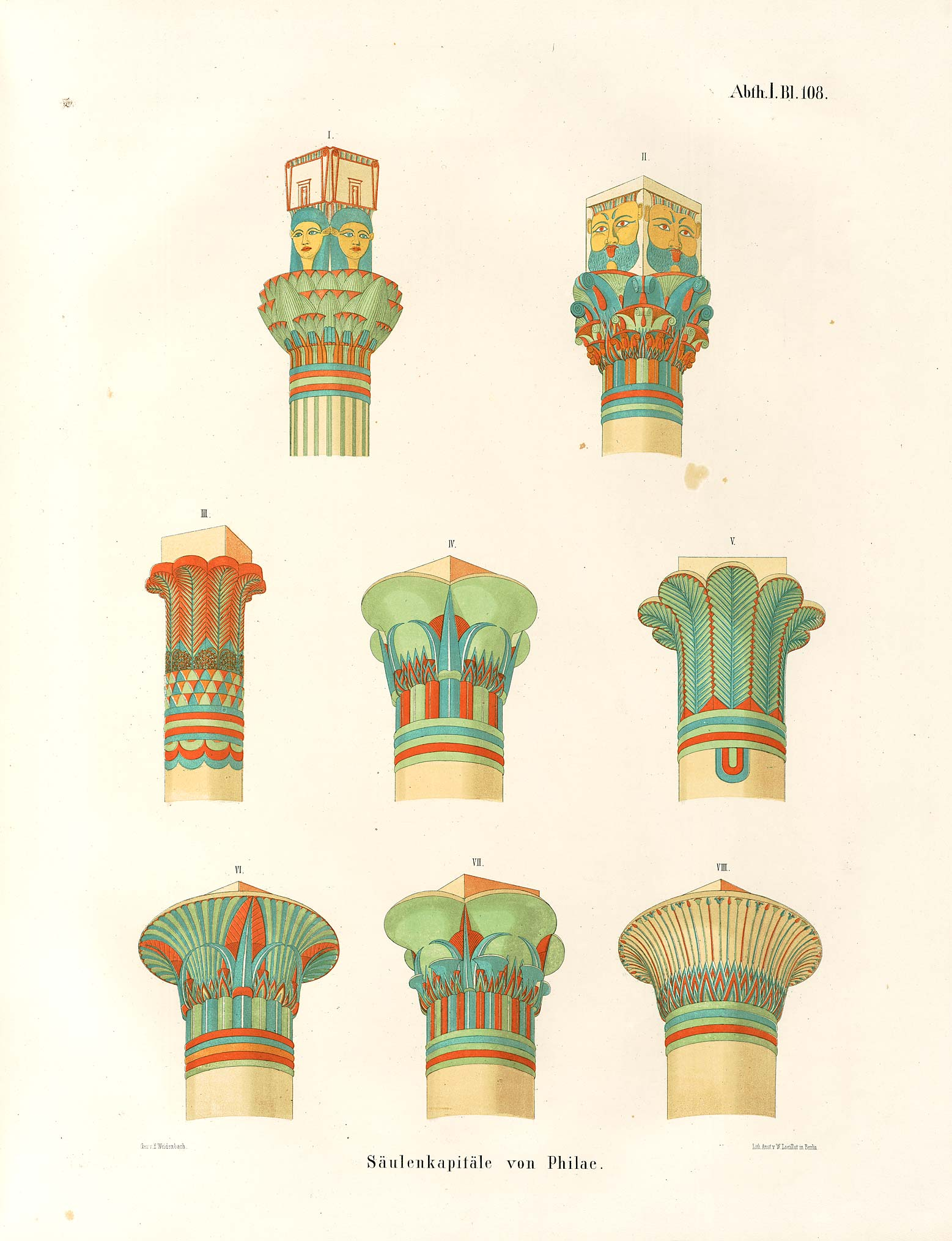
Illustration of various types of capitals, drawn by the egyptologist Karl Richard Lepsius

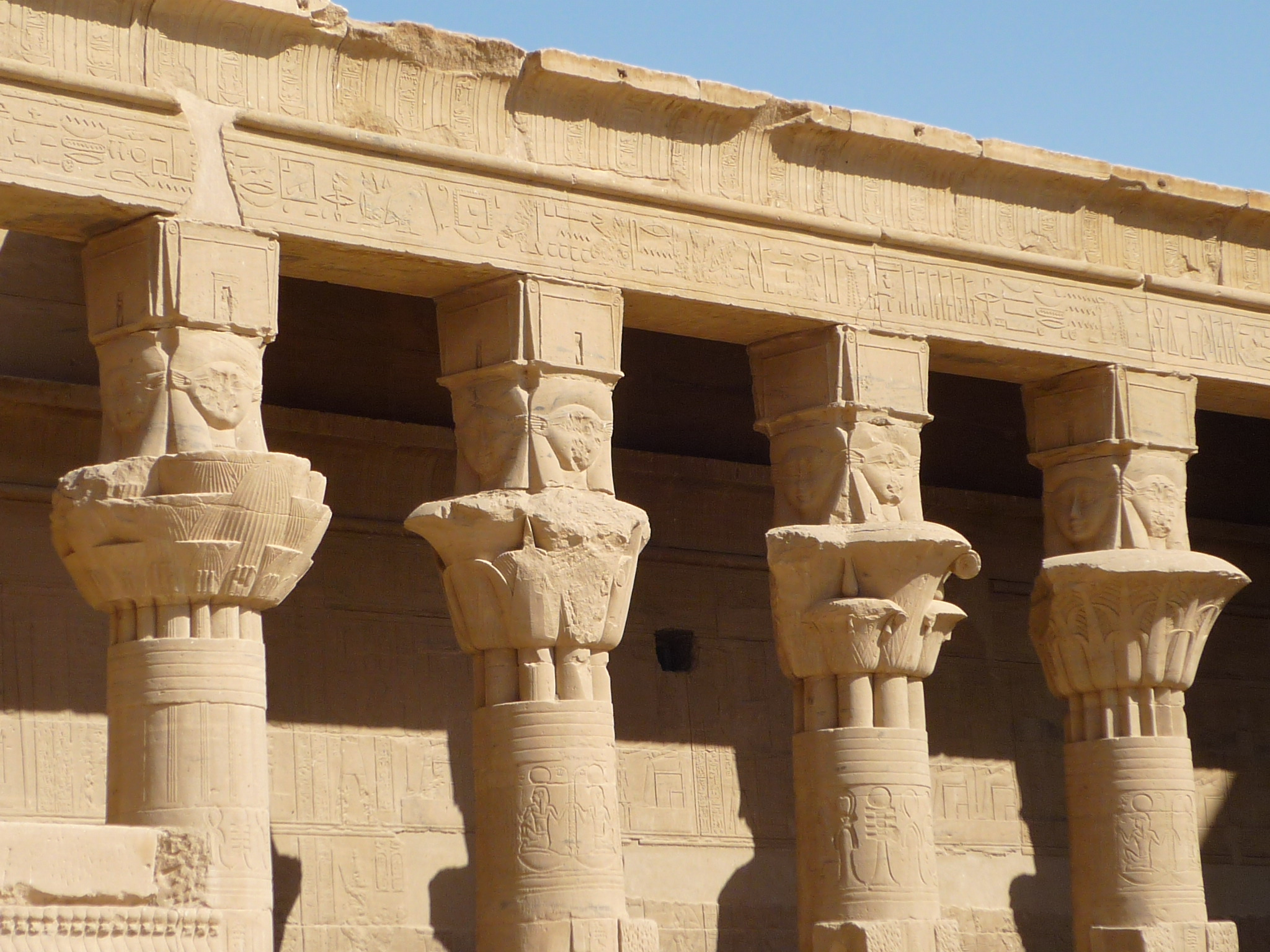
Columns with Hathoric capitals

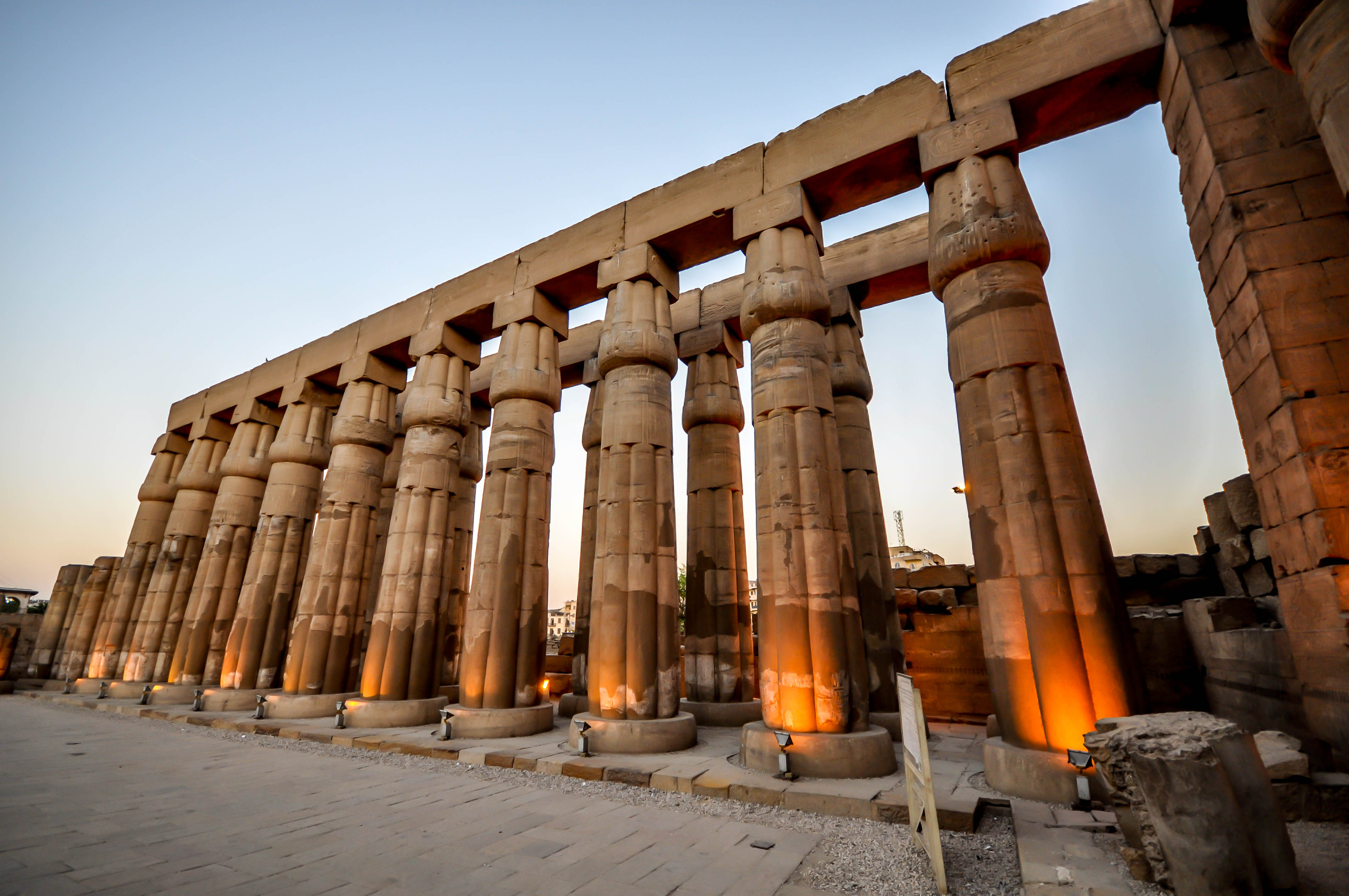
Papyriform columns of the Luxor Temple

==== Greek and Roman ====
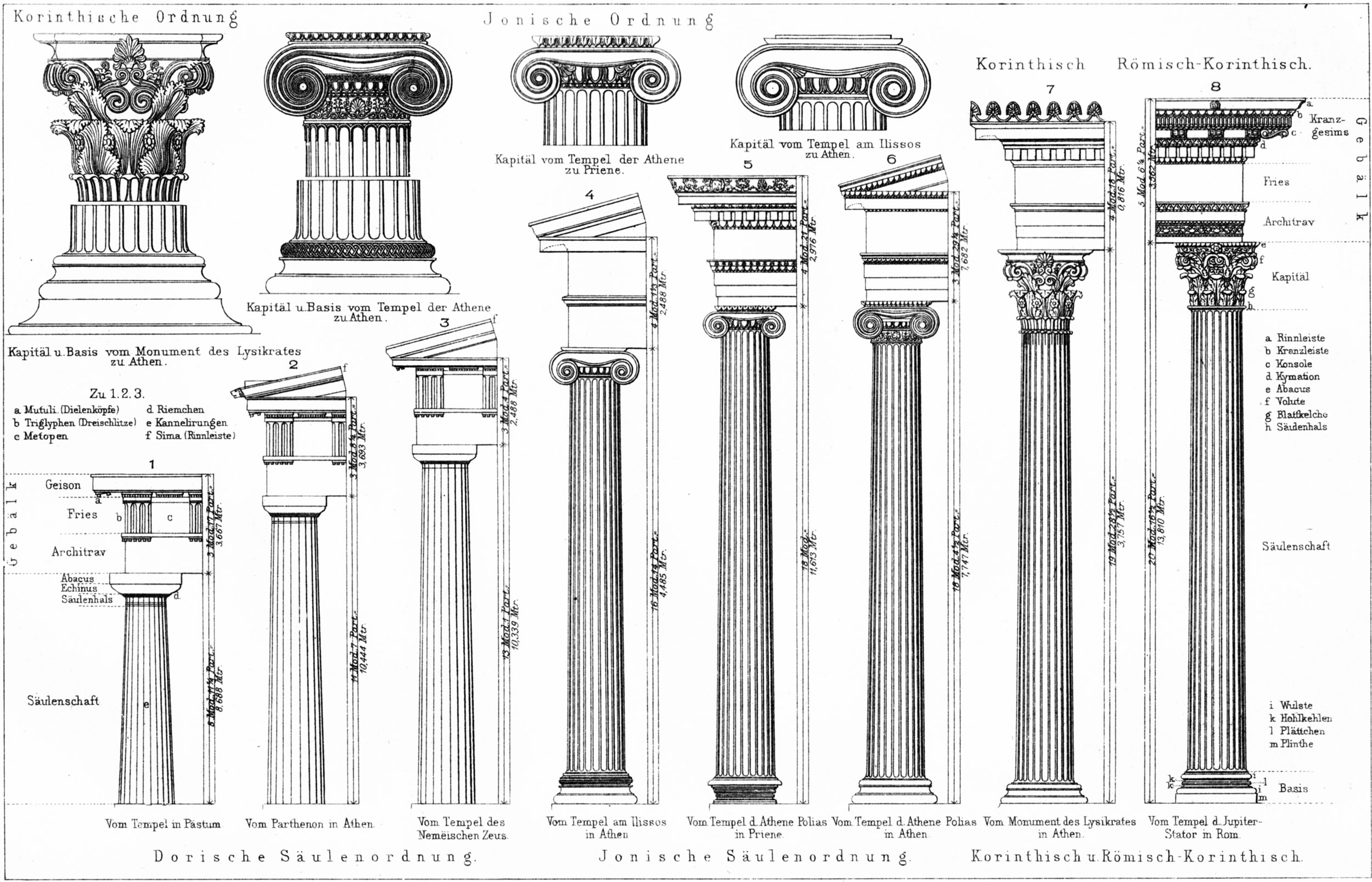
Illustration of Doric (left three), Ionic (middle three) and Corinthian (right two) columns

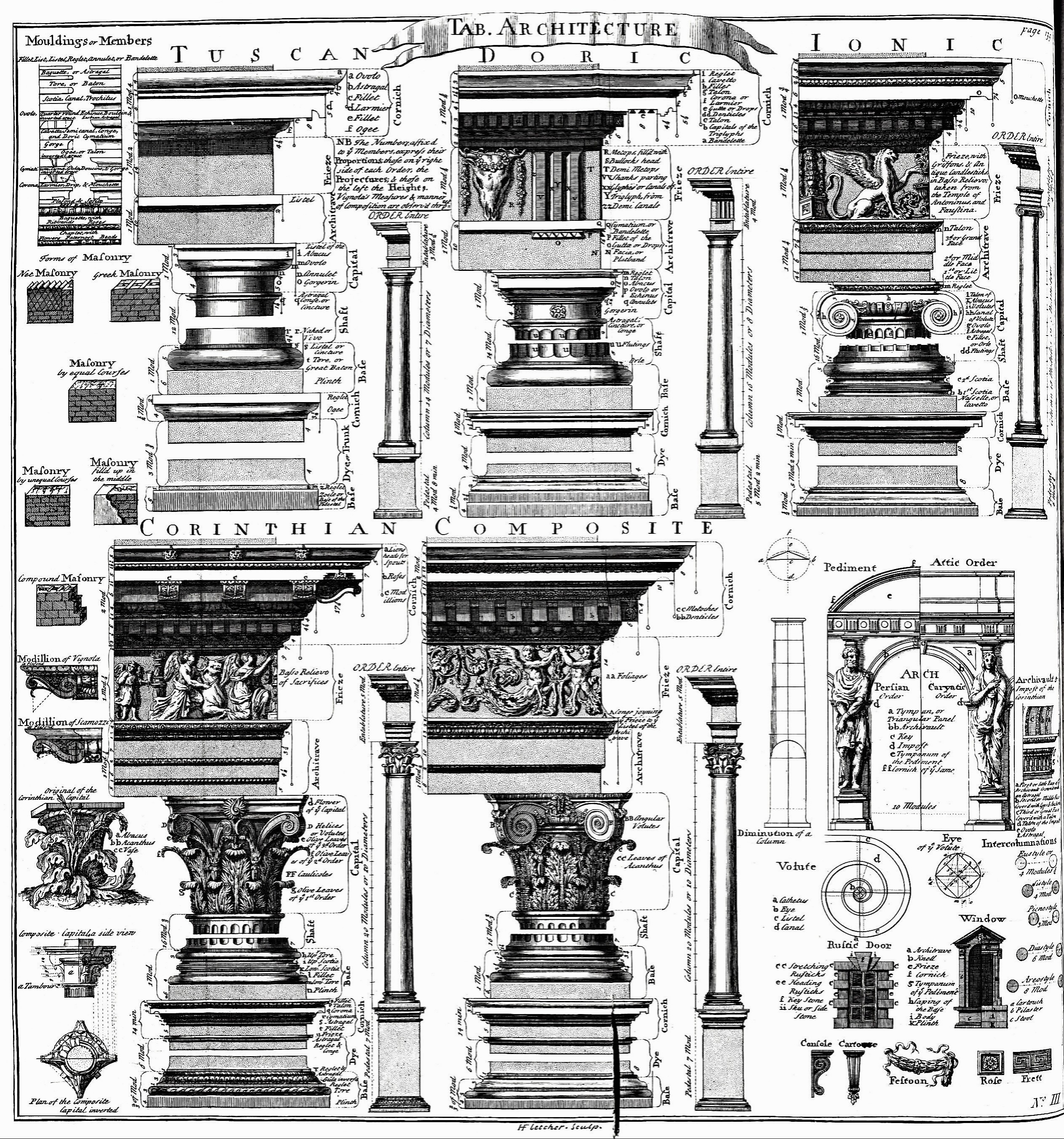
Very detailed illustrations of the Tuscan, Doric, Ionic, Corinthian and Composite orders

Very simple detailed of the Doric, Tuscan, Ionic, Corinthian and Composite orders

The Minoans used whole tree-trunks, placed on a stylobate (floor base) and topped by a simple round pillow-like capital. These were then painted as in the most famous Minoan palace of Knossos. The Minoans employed columns to create large open-plan spaces, light-wells and as a focal point for religious rituals.

These traditions were continued by the later Mycenaean civilization, particularly in the megaron or hall at the heart of their palaces. The importance of columns and their reference to palaces and therefore authority is evidenced in their use in heraldic motifs such as the famous lion-gate of Mycenae where two lions stand each side of a column. While these early wooden columns have not survived, their stone bases have and it is through these that we may see their use and arrangement in palace buildings.

The Egyptians, Persians, and other civilizations used columns for the practical purpose of holding up the roof inside a building, preferring outside walls to be decorated with reliefs or painting, but the Ancient Greeks, followed by the Romans, used them on the outside as well, and the extensive use of columns on the interior and exterior of buildings is one of the most characteristic features of classical architecture, in buildings like the Parthenon. The Greeks developed the classical orders of architecture, which are most easily distinguished by the form of the column and its various elements. Their Doric, Ionic, and Corinthian orders were expanded by the Romans to include the Tuscan and Composite orders.

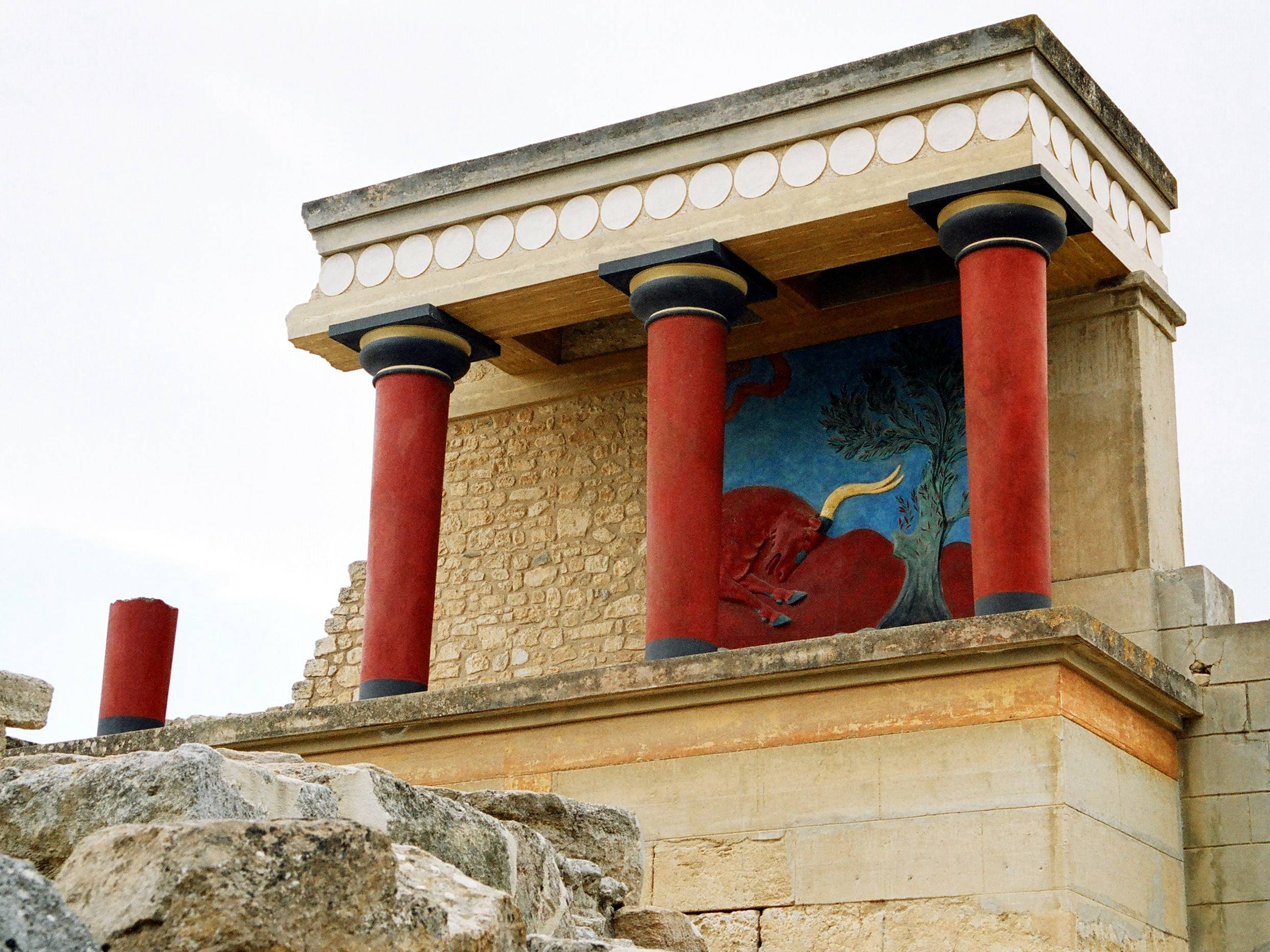
Minoan columns at the West Bastion of the Palace of Knossos

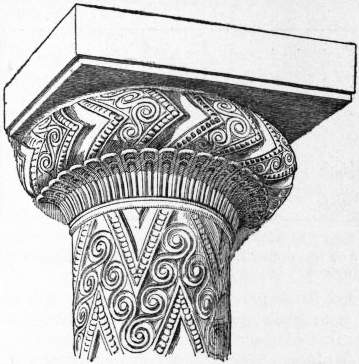
Illustration of the end of a Mycenaean column, from the Tomb of Agamemnon

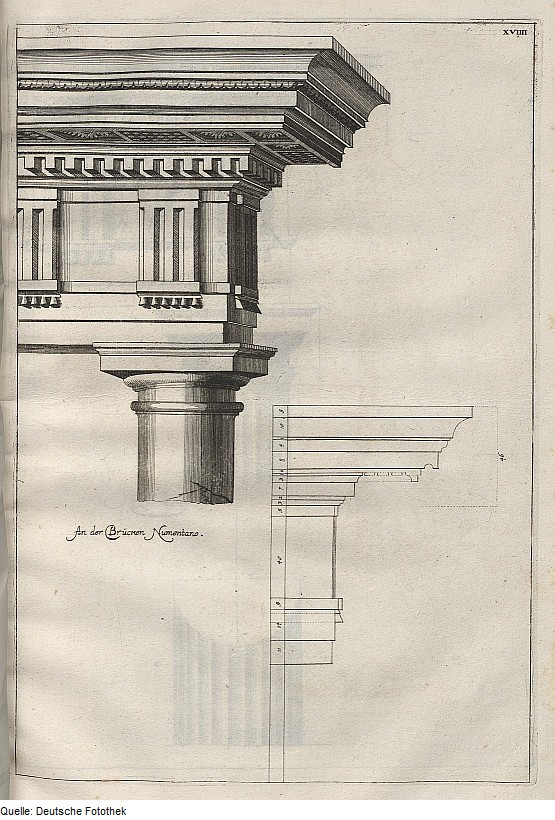
Illustration of the Tuscan order

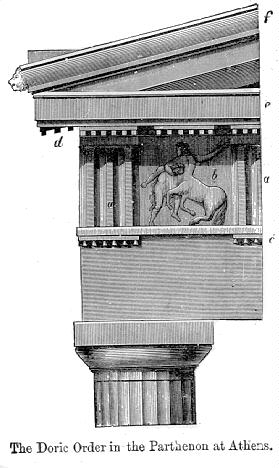
Illustration of the Doric order

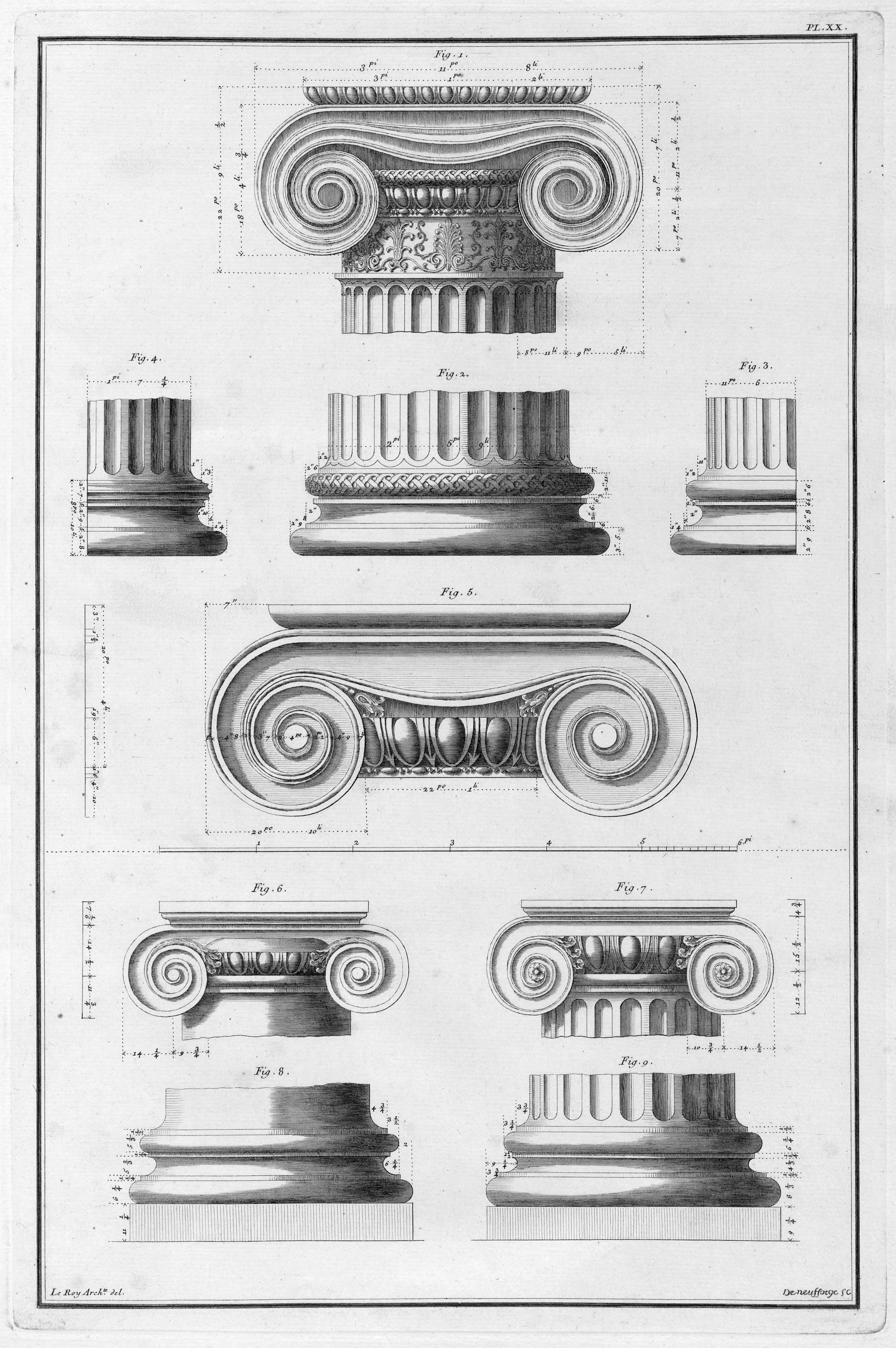
Illustration of the Ionic order

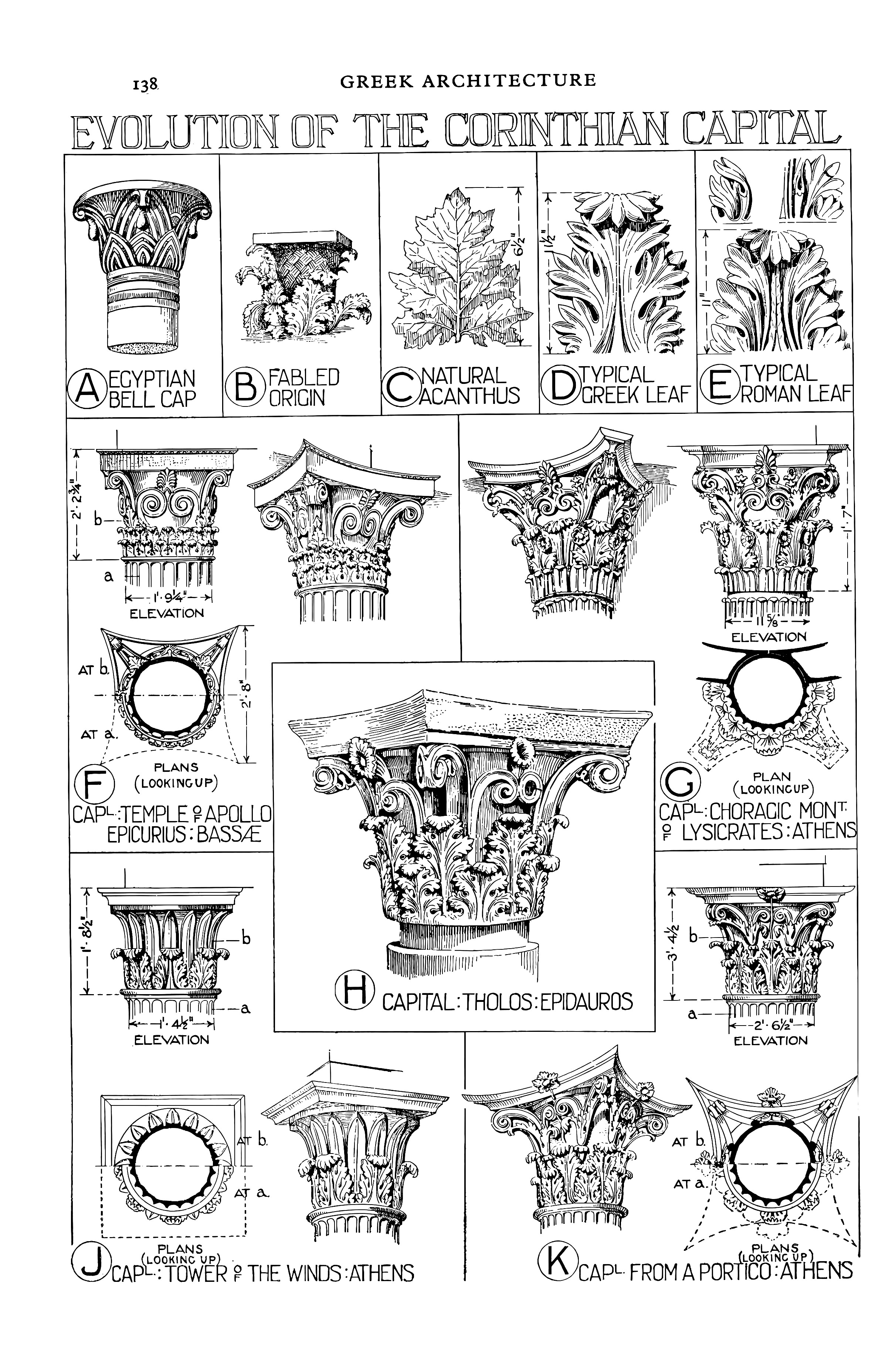
Evolution of the Corinthian order

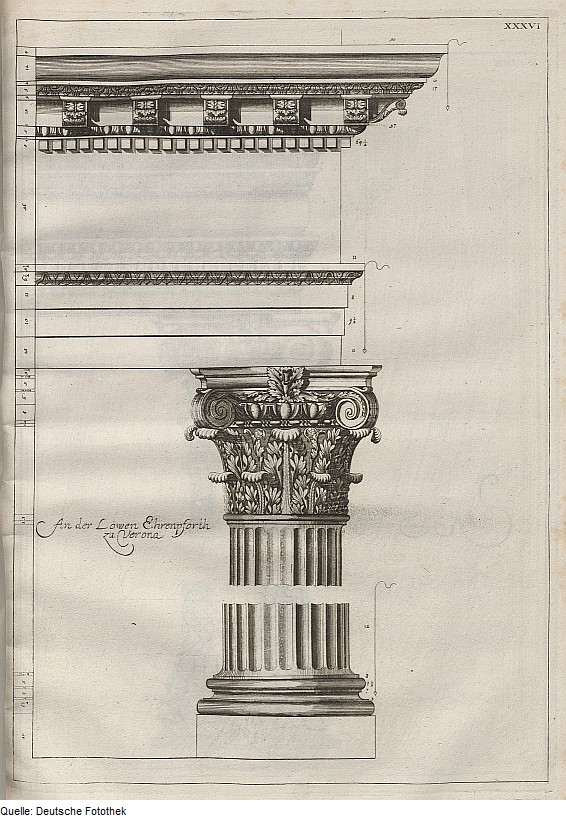
Illustration of the Composite order

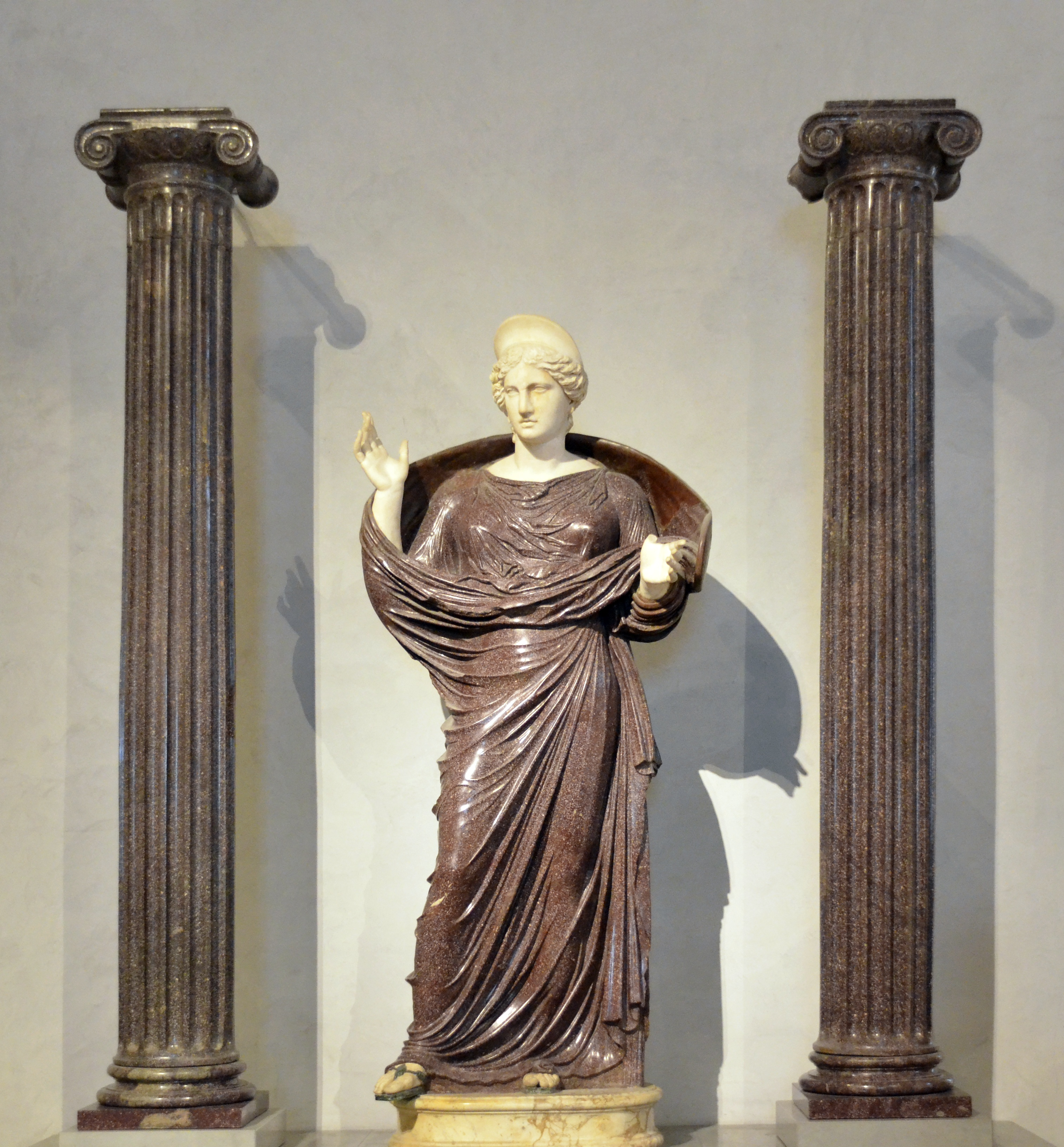
Praying Woman between two ionic columns, 2nd century, marble, in the Louvre

==== Persian ====
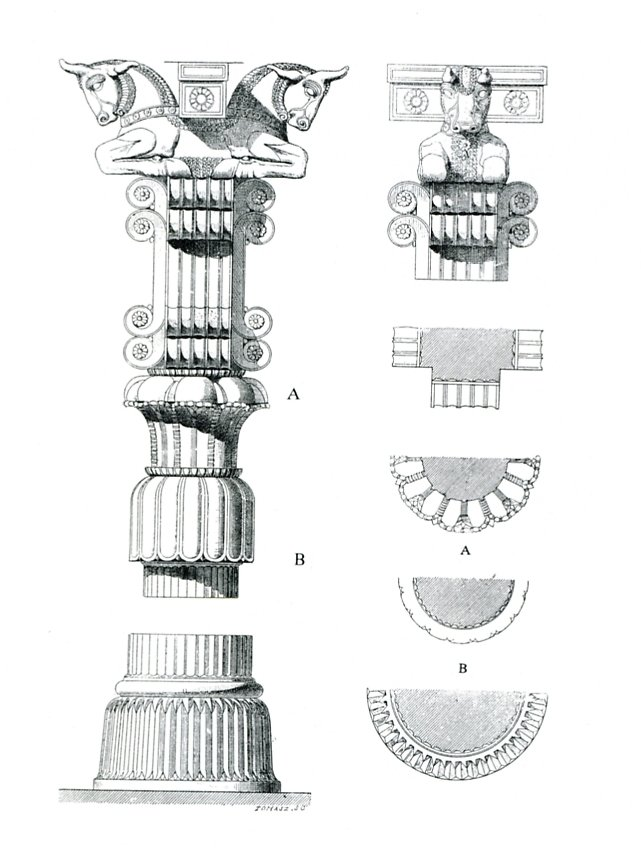
Plan, front view and side view of a typical Persepolis column, of Persia (Iran)

Some of the most elaborate columns in the ancient world were those of the Persians, especially the massive stone columns erected in Persepolis. They included double-bull structures in their capitals. The Hall of Hundred Columns at Persepolis, measuring 70 × 70 metres, was built by the Achaemenid king Darius I (524–486 BC). Many of the ancient Persian columns are still standing, particularly at sites such as Persepolis; some were originally around 20–24 metres tall, making them among the tallest columns of the ancient world. Tall columns with bull's head capitals were used for porticoes and to support the roofs of the hypostyle hall, partly inspired by the ancient Egyptian precedent. Since the columns carried timber beams rather than stone, they could be taller, slimmer and more widely spaced than Egyptian ones.

==== South Asia ====
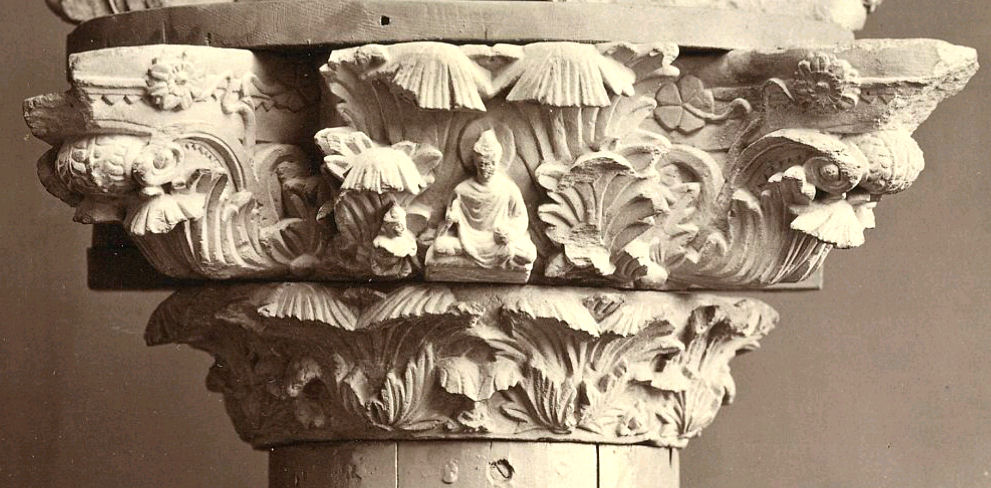
Indo-Corinthian capital with Buddha figure, Gandhara, Jamal Garhi.

Indo-Corinthian capitals are capitals crowning columns or pilasters, which can be found in the northwestern Indian subcontinent, and usually combine Hellenistic and Indian elements. These capitals are typically dated to the first centuries of the Common Era, and constitute an important aspect of Greco-Buddhist art. Indo-Corinthian capitals display a design and foliage structure which is derived from the academic Corinthian capital developed in Greece. Its importation to India followed the road of Hellenistic expansion in the East in the centuries after the conquests of Alexander the Great. In particular the Greco-Bactrian kingdom, centered on Bactria (today's northern Afghanistan), upheld the type at the doorstep of India, in such places as Ai-Khanoum until the end of the 2nd century BCE. In India, the design was often adapted, usually taking a more elongated form and sometimes being combined with scrolls, generally within the context of Buddhist stupas and temples.

=== Middle Ages ===
Columns, or at least large structural exterior ones, became much less significant in the architecture of the Middle Ages. The classical forms were abandoned in both Byzantine and Romanesque architecture in favour of more flexible forms, with capitals often using various types of foliage decoration, and in the West scenes with figures carved in relief.

During the Romanesque period, builders continued to reuse and imitate ancient Roman columns wherever possible; where new, the emphasis was on elegance and beauty, as illustrated by twisted columns. Often they were decorated with mosaics.

Examples of columns

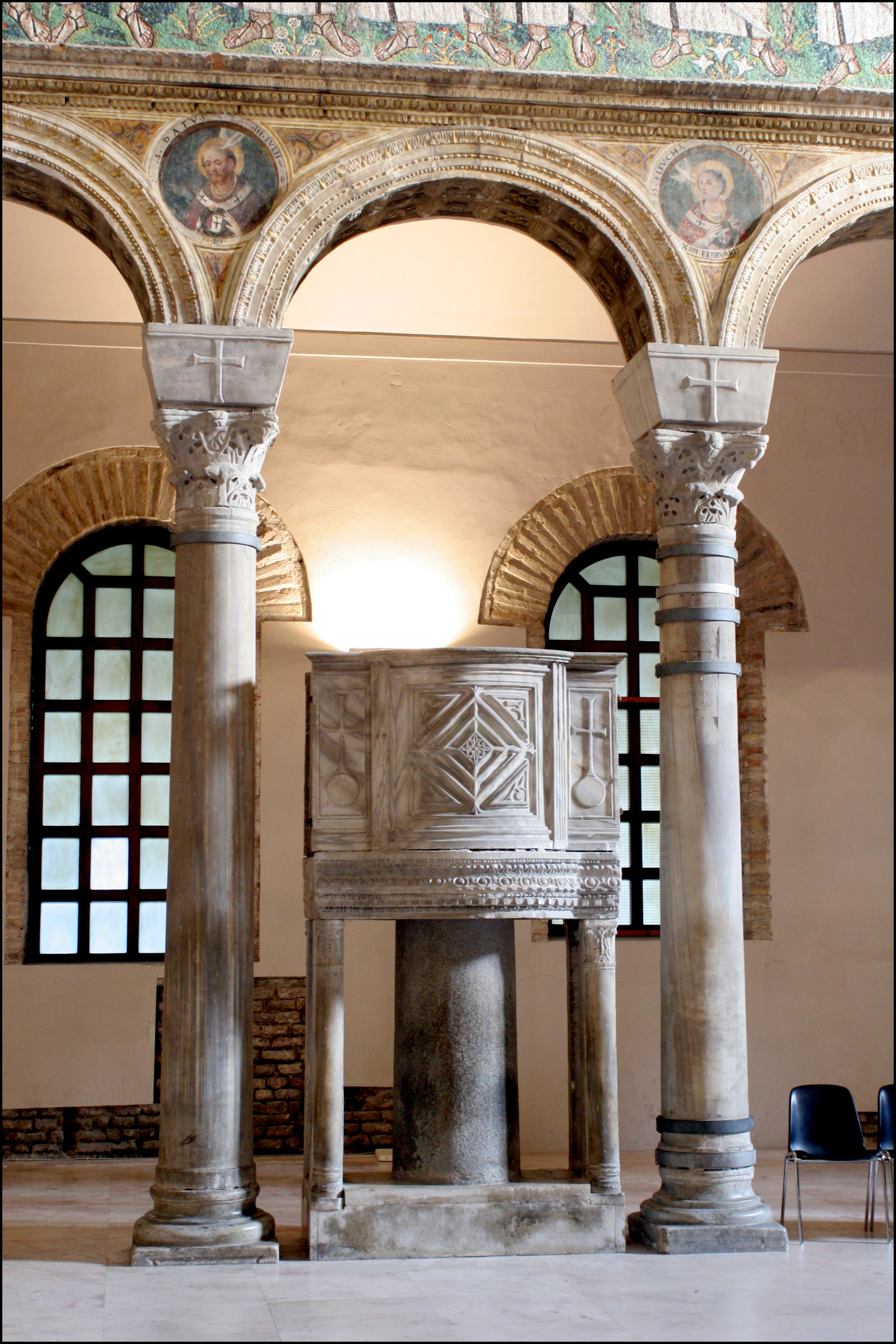
Byzantine columns from Basilica of Sant'Apollinare Nuovo (Ravenna, Italy)

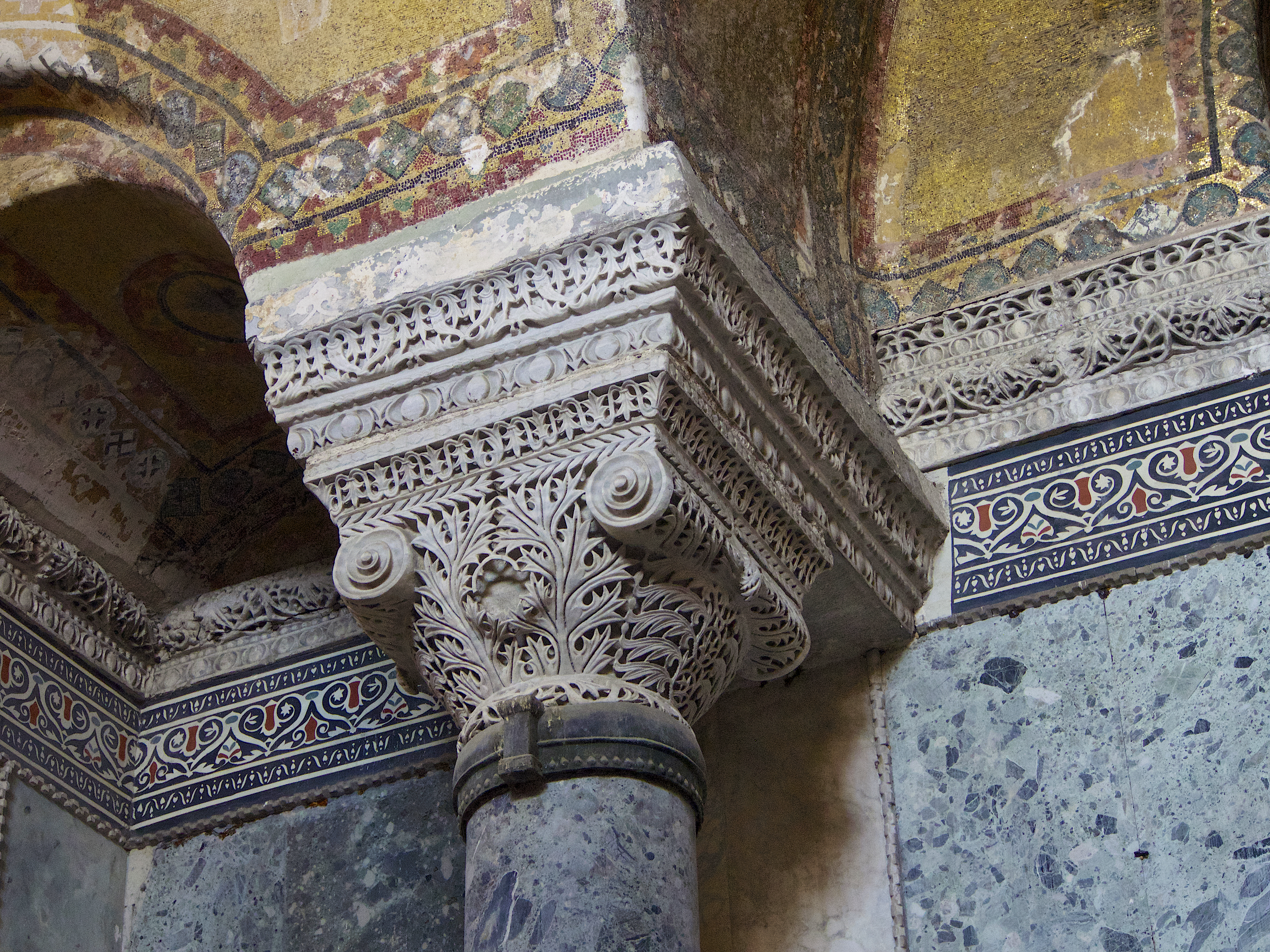
The capital of a Byzantine column from Hagia Sophia (Istanbul, Turkey)

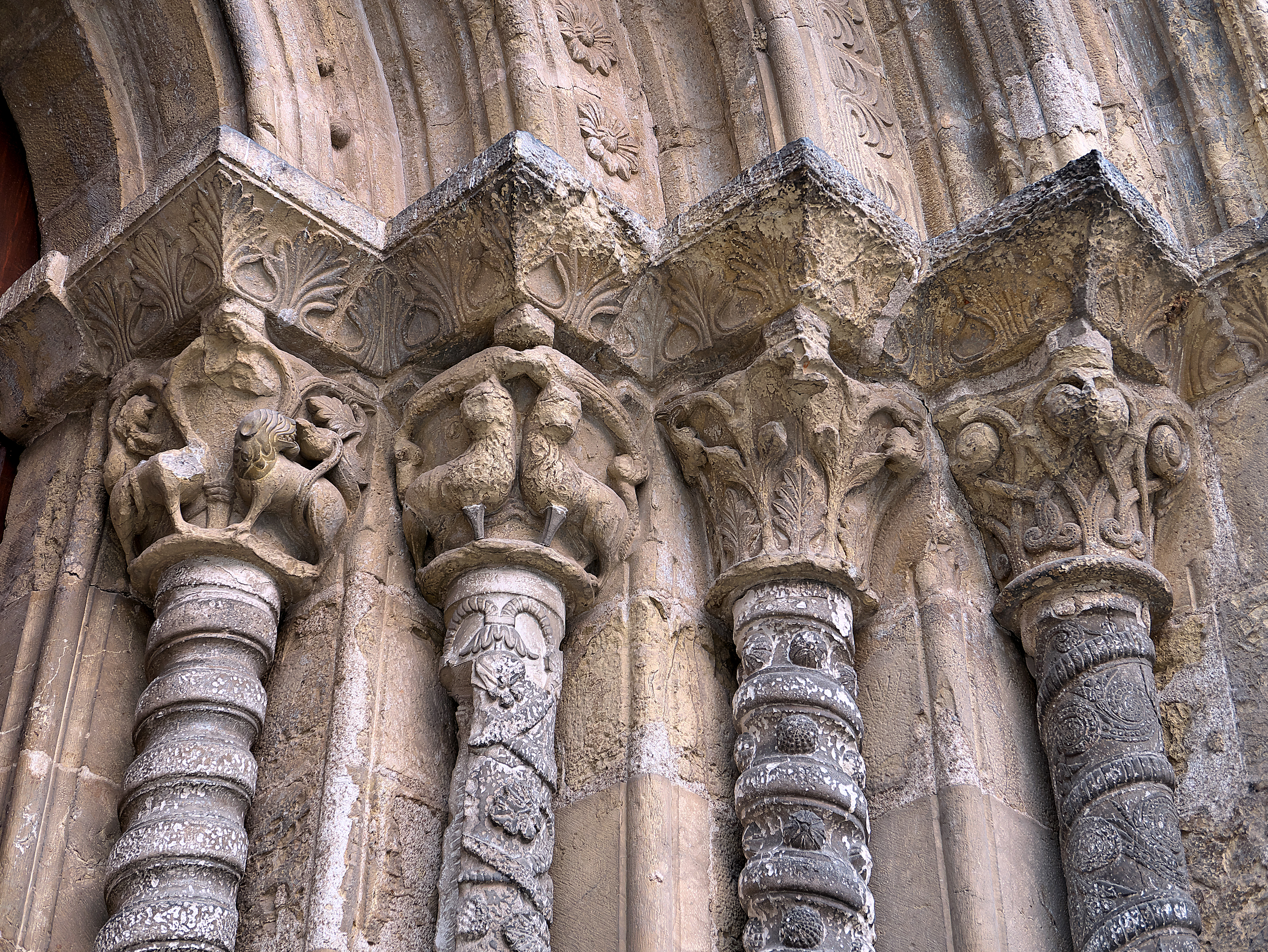
Romanesque columns from the 12th century (Coimbra, Portugal)

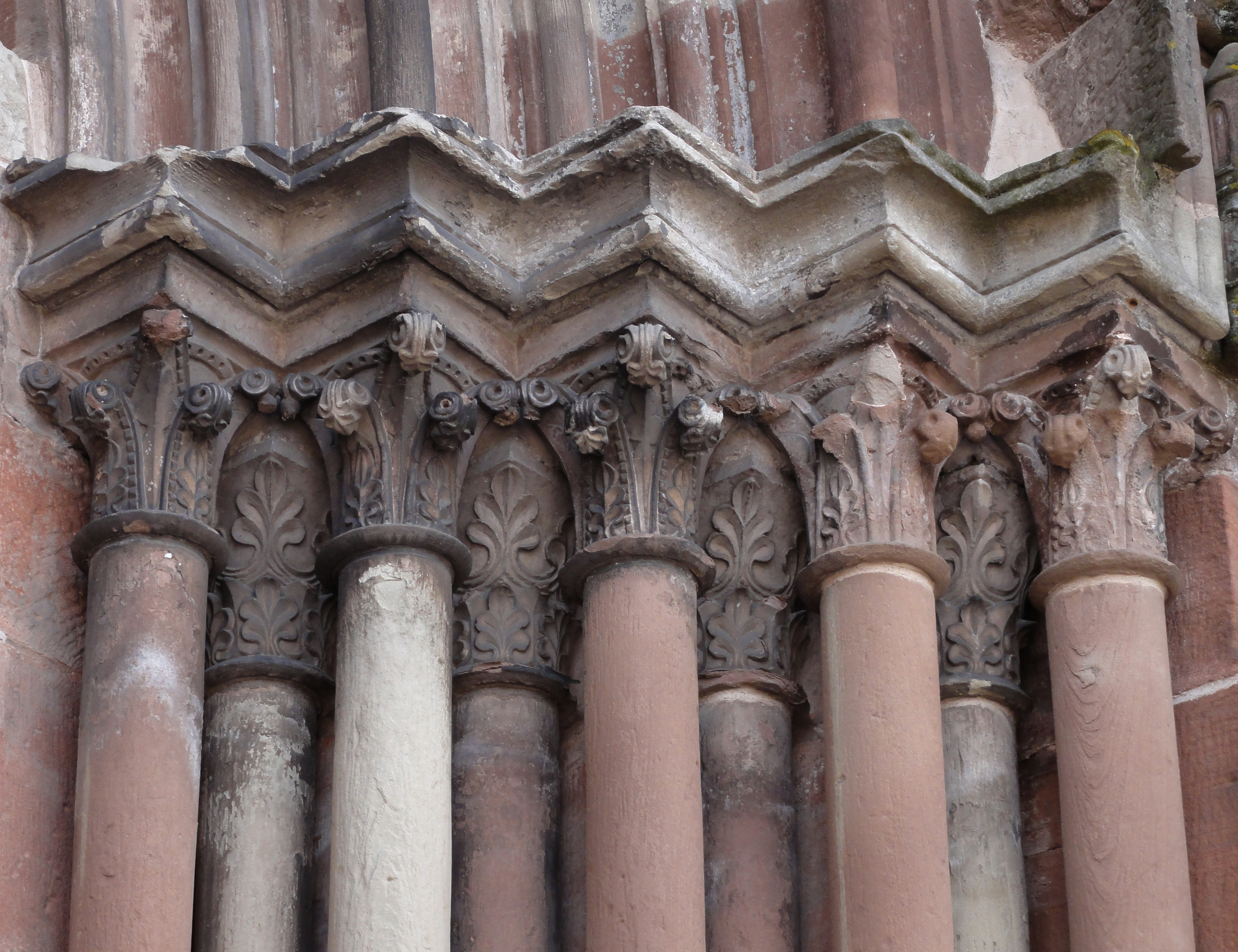
Gothic columns of a church from Neuwiller-lès-Saverne (France)

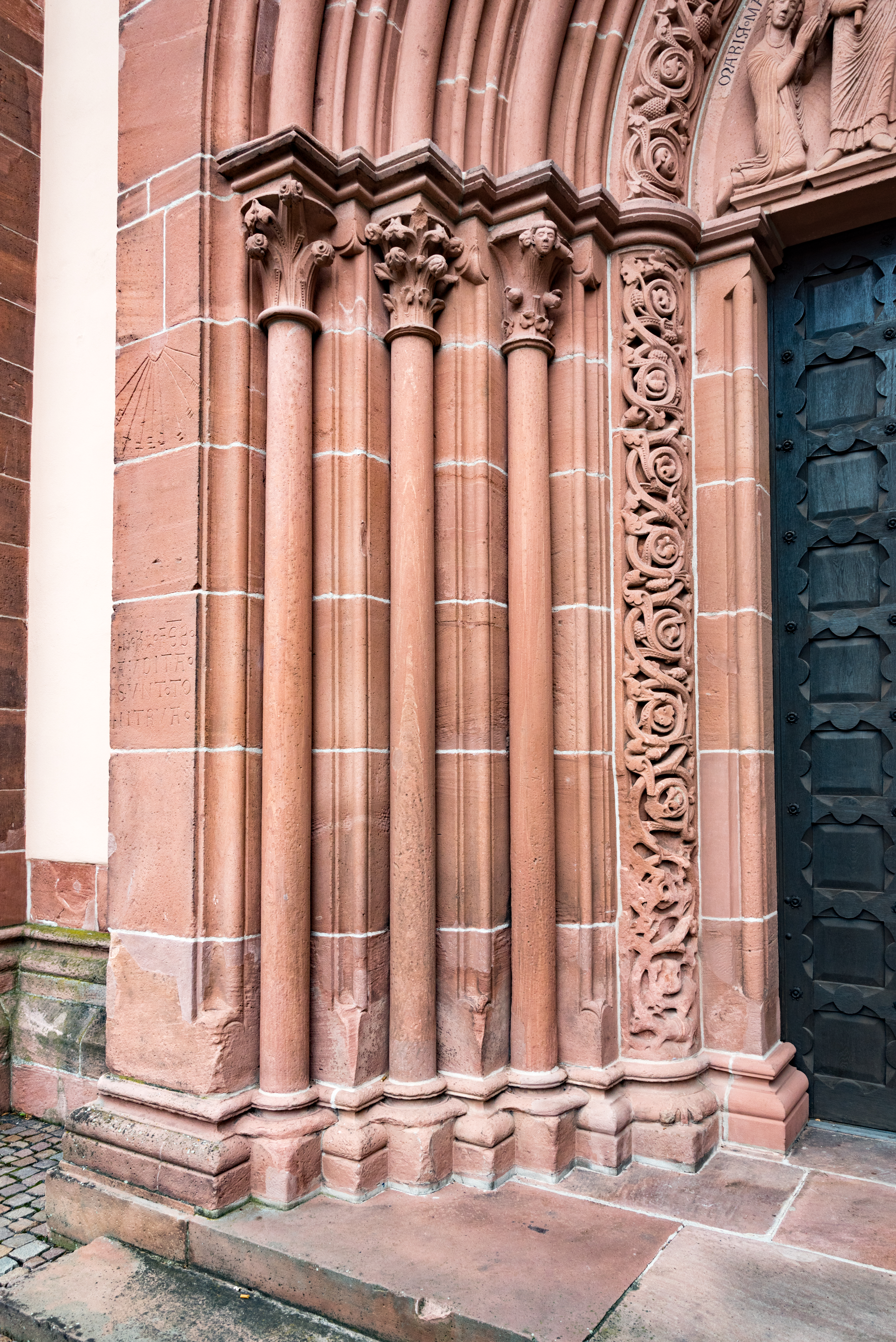
Slender Gothic columns at a portal of Marienkirche Gelnhausen (Gelnhausen, Germany)

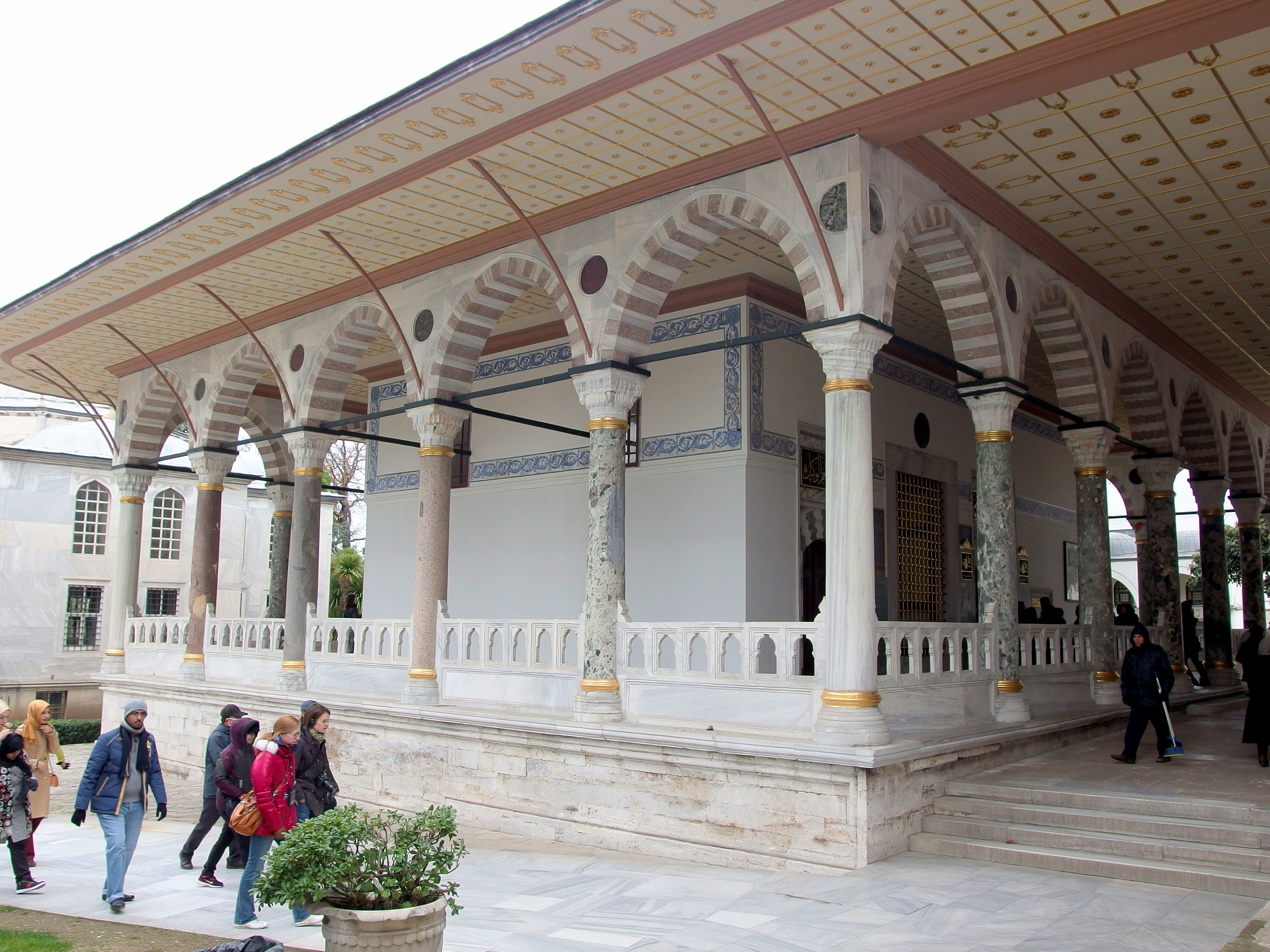
Column use is common in Ottoman architecture, an example in Topkapı Palace (Istanbul, Turkey)

=== Mesoamerica ===
In Teotihuacan's unique grid-planned layout, elaborate palace compounds such as the Palace of Quetzalpapálotl, located southwest of the Pyramid of the Moon, featured facades and columns decorated with low-relief carvings. This palace's open patio was surrounded by heavy stone columns incised on three sides with bas-reliefs, adorned with water symbols on cornices painted red and white.

At Tula, the Pyramid of the Atlanteans was supported by huge stone columns carved as warriors bearing atlatls, sheaves of arrows, butterfly breast plates, and solar discs, while the nearby Great Vestibule featured an L-shaped platform with dozens of stubbed columns.

Puuc Maya architecture is distinguished by round columns with entasis and square capitals placed in doorways, as seen at Sayil's Palace with its porticoed chambers featuring round columns, and at Labna, where freestanding, round columns with capitals appear alongside carved stone facades. At Chacmultun, the Puuc style is expressed with colonettes (small columns) on upper facades, columned doorways, and rounded columns at Building 1.

Columns at Chichen Itza appear in several architectural forms, most notably colonnaded halls, which are long masonry structures fronted by a series of columns that functioned as administrative buildings for the elite, and gallery‑patios, which combine a long, open colonnaded gallery with a rectangular patio that uses interior columns to widen the interior space. Both types are common at Chichen Itza but rare elsewhere in Yucatán. Columns are also found at elite residences and, in decorative form, within Puuc‑style architecture. Many columns were carved with figures in elaborate costumes of military significance, and warrior columns represent a new artistic form introduced during the Early Postclassic period. In the Group of the Thousand Columns (dating to ca. 950/980–1050/1100), the Mercado features alternating piers and columns that were painted with yellow, red, and blue registers and once supported a vaulted roof, while other columns in the structure framed a shallow impluvium.

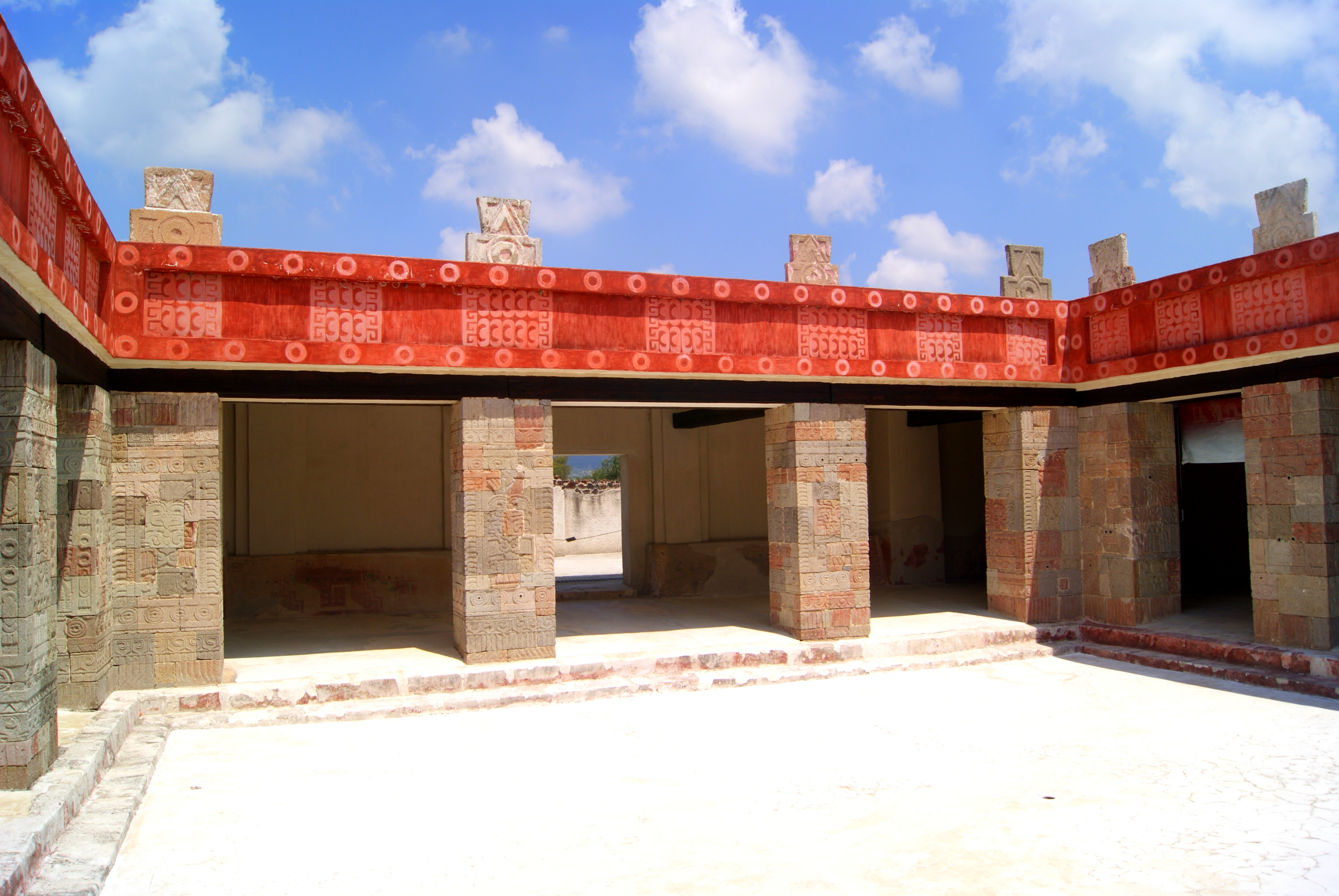
Courtyard of the Quetzalpapalotl Palace in Teotihuacan with square columns adorned with mythological birds

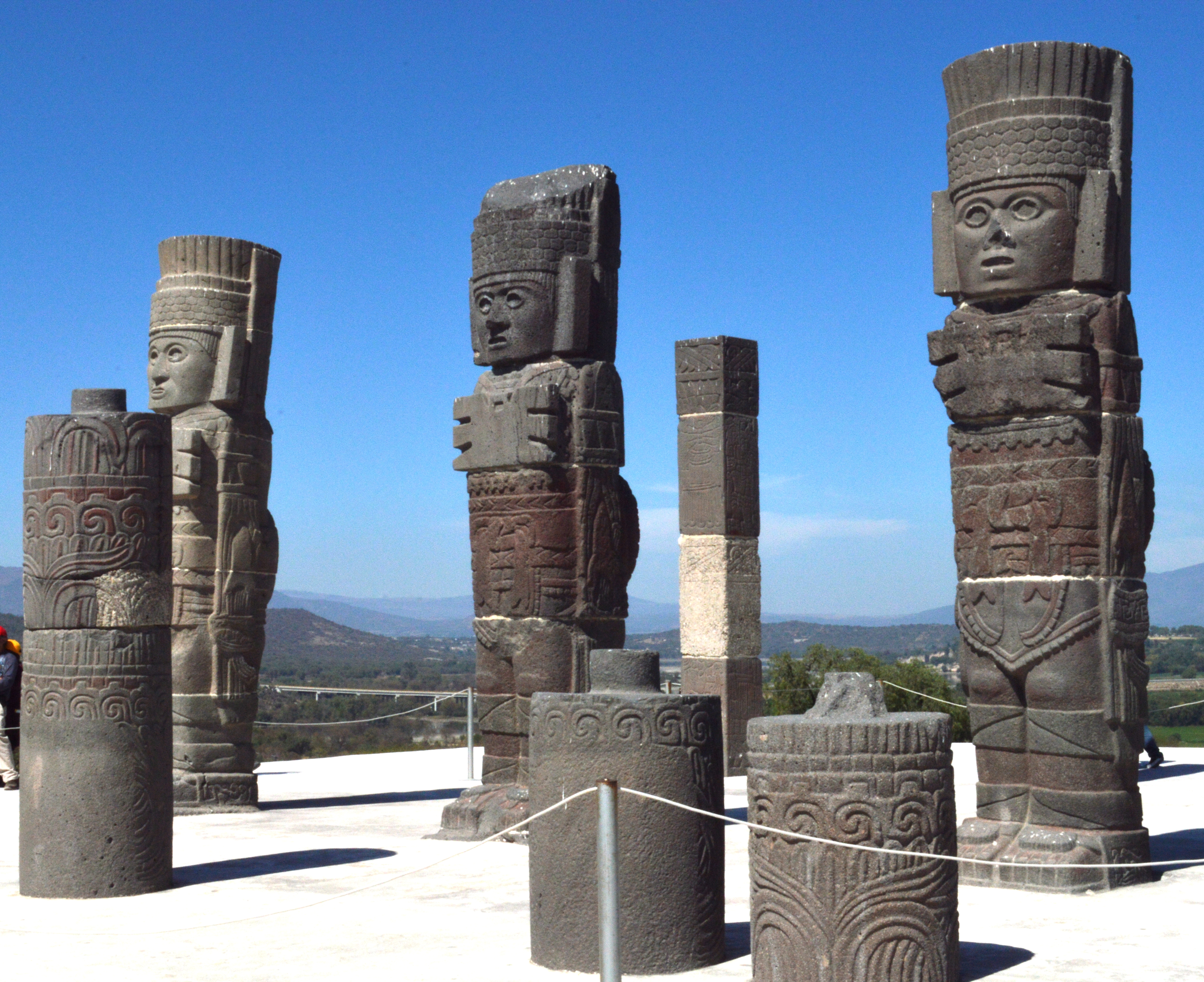
The Atlantean figures and the remaining column drums in the shape of feathered serpents in Tula. Originally, they provided the support for the roof of a structure on top of Pyramid B.

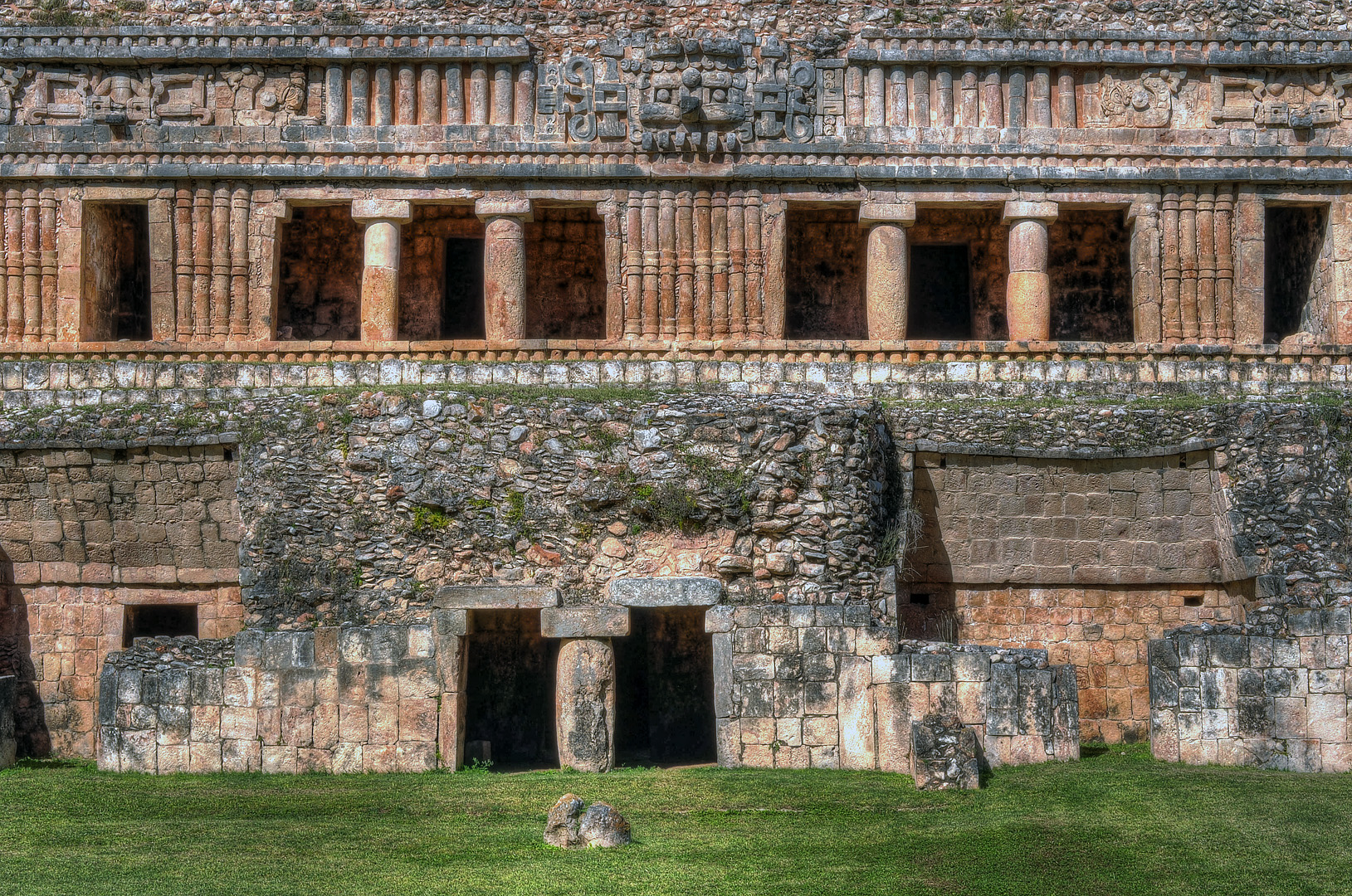
Load bearing columns and engaged columns in the facade of the Grand Palace of Sayil

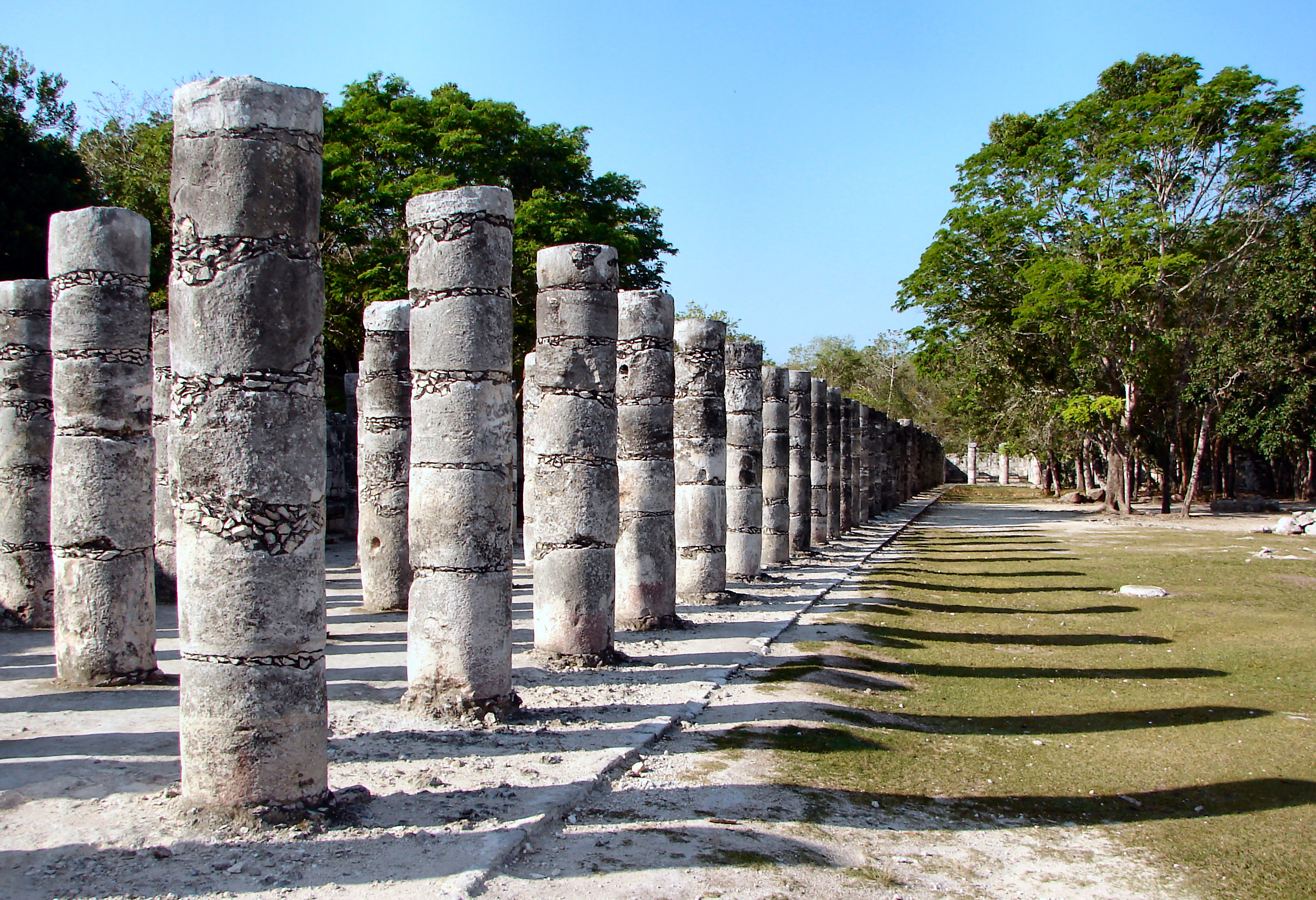
Columns in the Group of a Thousand Columns, an architectural complex in Chichen Itza

=== Renaissance and later styles ===
Renaissance architecture was keen to revive the classical vocabulary and styles, and the informed use and variation of the classical orders remained fundamental to the training of architects throughout Baroque, Rococo and Neo-classical architecture.

== Structure ==
Early columns were constructed of stone, some out of a single piece of stone. Monolithic columns are among the heaviest stones used in architecture. Other stone columns are created out of multiple sections of stone, mortared or dry-fit together. In many classical sites, sectioned columns were carved with a centre hole or depression so that they could be pegged together, using stone or metal pins. The design of most classical columns incorporates entasis (the inclusion of a slight outward curve in the sides) plus a reduction in diameter along the height of the column, so that the top is as little as 83% of the bottom diameter. This reduction mimics the parallax effects which the eye expects to see, and tends to make columns look taller and straighter than they are while entasis adds to that effect.

There are flutes and fillets that run up the shaft of columns. The flute is the part of the column that is indented in with a semi circular shape. The fillet of the column is the part between each of the flutes on the Ionic order columns. The flute width changes on all tapered columns as it goes up the shaft and stays the same on all non tapered columns. This was done to the columns to add visual interest to them. The Ionic and the Corinthian are the only orders that have fillets and flutes. The Doric style has flutes but not fillets. Doric flutes are connected at a sharp point where the fillets are located on Ionic and Corinthian order columns.

=== Nomenclature ===
Most classical columns arise from a basis, or base, that rests on the stylobate, or foundation, except for those of the Doric order, which usually rest directly on the stylobate. The basis may consist of several elements, beginning with a wide, square slab known as a plinth. The simplest bases consist of the plinth alone, sometimes separated from the column by a convex circular cushion known as a torus. More elaborate bases include two toruses, separated by a concave section or channel known as a scotia or trochilus. Scotiae could also occur in pairs, separated by a convex section called an astragal, or bead, narrower than a torus. Sometimes these sections were accompanied by still narrower convex sections, known as annulets or fillets.

At the top of the shaft is a capital, upon which the roof or other architectural elements rest. In the case of Doric columns, the capital usually consists of a round, tapering cushion, or echinus, supporting a square slab, known as an abax or abacus. Ionic capitals feature a pair of volutes, or scrolls, while Corinthian capitals are decorated with reliefs in the form of acanthus leaves. Either type of capital could be accompanied by the same moldings as the base. In the case of free-standing columns, the decorative elements atop the shaft are known as a finial.

Modern columns may be constructed out of steel, poured or precast concrete, or brick, left bare or clad in an architectural covering, or veneer. Used to support an arch, an impost, or pier, is the topmost member of a column. The bottom-most part of the arch, called the springing, rests on the impost.

=== Equilibrium, instability, and loads ===
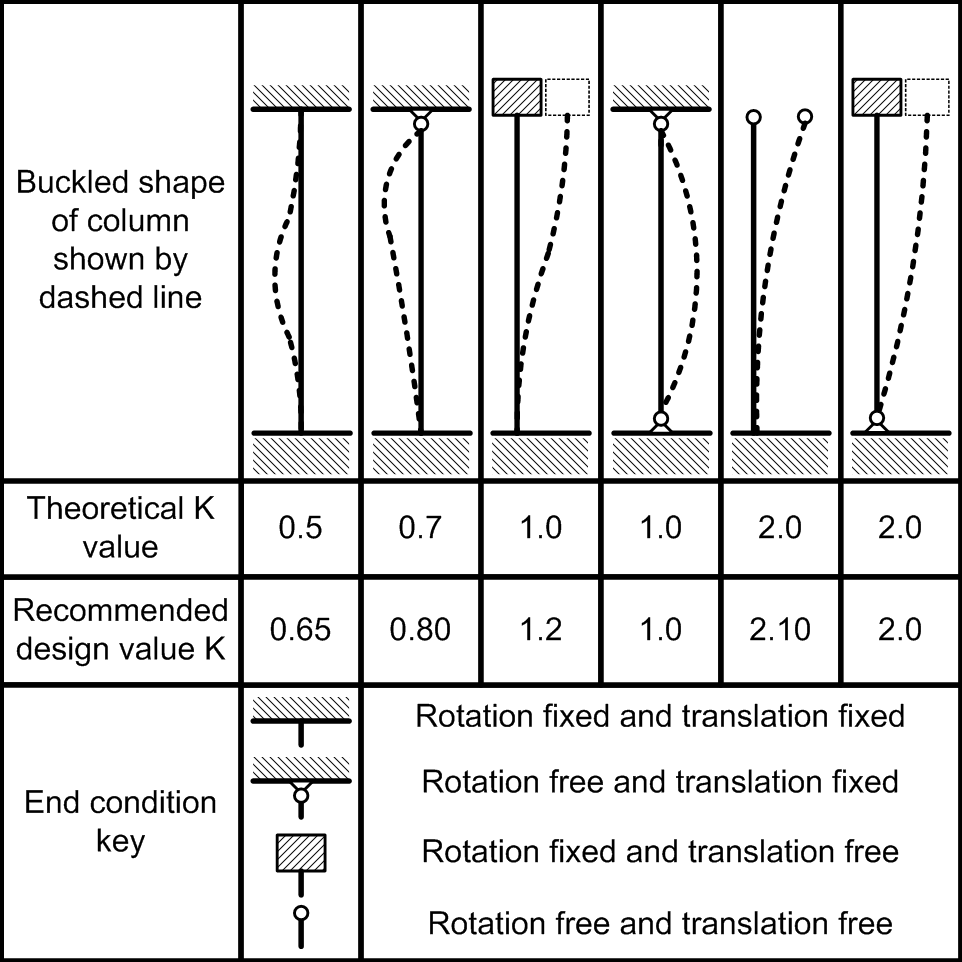
Table showing values of K for structural columns of various end conditions (adapted from Manual of Steel Construction, 8th edition, American Institute of Steel Construction, Table C1.8.1)

As the axial load on a perfectly straight slender column with elastic material properties is increased in magnitude, this ideal column passes through three states: stable equilibrium, neutral equilibrium, and instability. The straight column under load is in stable equilibrium if a lateral force, applied between the two ends of the column, produces a small lateral deflection which disappears and the column returns to its straight form when the lateral force is removed. If the column load is gradually increased, a condition is reached in which the straight form of equilibrium becomes so-called neutral equilibrium, and a small lateral force will produce a deflection that does not disappear and the column remains in this slightly bent form when the lateral force is removed. The load at which neutral equilibrium of a column is reached is called the critical or buckling load. The state of instability is reached when a slight increase of the column load causes uncontrollably growing lateral deflections leading to complete collapse.

For an axially loaded straight column with any end support conditions, the equation of static equilibrium, in the form of a differential equation, can be solved for the deflected shape and critical load of the column. With hinged, fixed or free end support conditions the deflected shape in neutral equilibrium of an initially straight column with uniform cross section throughout its length always follows a partial or composite sinusoidal curve shape, and the critical load is given by

$f_{cr}\equiv\frac{\pi^2\textit{E}I_{min}}{{L}^2}\qquad (1)$

where E = elastic modulus of the material, I_{min} = the minimal moment of inertia of the cross section, and L = actual length of the column between its two end supports. A variant of (1) is given by

$f_{cr}\equiv\frac{\pi^{2}E_T}{(\frac{KL}{r})^{2}}\qquad (2)$

where r = radius of gyration of column cross-section which is equal to the square root of (I/A), K = ratio of the longest half sine wave to the actual column length, E_{t} = tangent modulus at the stress F_{cr}, and KL = effective length (length of an equivalent hinged-hinged column). From Equation (2) it can be noted that the buckling strength of a column is inversely proportional to the square of its length.

When the critical stress, F_{cr} (F_{cr} =P_{cr}/A, where A = cross-sectional area of the column), is greater than the proportional limit of the material, the column is experiencing inelastic buckling. Since at this stress the slope of the material's stress-strain curve, E_{t} (called the tangent modulus), is smaller than that below the proportional limit, the critical load at inelastic buckling is reduced. More complex formulas and procedures apply for such cases, but in its simplest form the critical buckling load formula is given as Equation (3),

$f_{cr}\equiv{F_y}-\frac{F^{2}_{y}}{4\pi^{2}E}\left(\frac{KL}{r^2}\right)\qquad (3)$

A column with a cross section that lacks symmetry may suffer torsional buckling (sudden twisting) before, or in combination with, lateral buckling. The presence of the twisting deformations renders both theoretical analyses and practical designs rather complex.

Eccentricity of the load, or imperfections such as initial crookedness, decreases column strength. If the axial load on the column is not concentric, that is, its line of action is not precisely coincident with the centroidal axis of the column, the column is characterized as eccentrically loaded. The eccentricity of the load, or an initial curvature, subjects the column to immediate bending. The increased stresses due to the combined axial-plus-flexural stresses result in a reduced load-carrying ability.

Column elements are considered to be massive if their smallest side dimension is equal to or more than 400 mm. Massive columns have the ability to increase in carrying strength over long time periods (even during periods of heavy load). Taking into account the fact, that possible structural loads may increase over time as well (and also the threat of progressive failure), massive columns have an advantage compared to non-massive ones.

=== Extensions ===
When a column is too long to be built or transported in one piece, it has to be extended or spliced at the construction site. A reinforced concrete column is extended by having the steel reinforcing bars protrude a few inches or feet above the top of the concrete, then placing the next level of reinforcing bars to overlap, and pouring the concrete of the next level. A steel column is extended by welding or bolting splice plates on the flanges and webs or walls of the columns to provide a few inches or feet of load transfer from the upper to the lower column section. A timber column is usually extended by the use of a steel tube or wrapped-around sheet-metal plate bolted onto the two connecting timber sections.

=== Foundations ===
A column that carries the load down to a foundation must have means to transfer the load without overstressing the foundation material. Reinforced concrete and masonry columns are generally built directly on top of concrete foundations. When seated on a concrete foundation, a steel column must have a base plate to spread the load over a larger area, and thereby reduce the bearing pressure. The base plate is a thick, rectangular steel plate usually welded to the bottom end of the column.

== Orders ==
The Roman author Vitruvius, relying on the writings (now lost) of Greek authors, tells us that the ancient Greeks believed that their Doric order developed from techniques for building in wood. The earlier smoothed tree-trunk was replaced by a stone cylinder.

=== Doric order ===
The Doric order is the oldest and simplest of the classical orders. It is composed of a vertical cylinder that is wider at the bottom. It generally has neither a base nor a detailed capital. It is instead often topped with an inverted frustum of a shallow cone or a cylindrical band of carvings. It is often referred to as the masculine order because it is represented in the bottom level of the Colosseum and the Parthenon, and was therefore considered to be able to hold more weight. The height-to-thickness ratio is about 8:1. The shaft of a Doric Column is almost always fluted.

The Greek Doric, developed in the western Dorian region of Greece, is the heaviest and most massive of the orders. It rises from the stylobate without any base; it is from four to six times as tall as its diameter; it has twenty broad flutes; the capital consists simply of a banded necking swelling out into a smooth echinus, which carries a flat square abacus; the Doric entablature is also the heaviest, being about one-fourth the height column. The Greek Doric order was not used after c. 100 B.C. until its “rediscovery” in the mid-eighteenth century.

=== Tuscan order ===
The Tuscan order, also known as Roman Doric, is also a simple design, the base and capital both being series of cylindrical disks of alternating diameter. The shaft is almost never fluted. The proportions vary, but are generally similar to Doric columns. Height to width ratio is about 7:1.

=== Ionic order ===
The Ionic column is considerably more complex than the Doric or Tuscan. It usually has a base and the shaft is often fluted (it has grooves carved up its length). The capital features a volute, an ornament shaped like a scroll, at the four corners. The height-to-thickness ratio is around 9:1. Due to the more refined proportions and scroll capitals, the Ionic column is sometimes associated with academic buildings. Ionic style columns were used on the second level of the Colosseum.

=== Corinthian order ===
The Corinthian order is named for the Greek city-state of Corinth, to which it was connected in the period. However, according to the architectural historian Vitruvius, the column was created by the sculptor Callimachus, probably an Athenian, who drew acanthus leaves growing around a votive basket. In fact, the oldest known Corinthian capital was found in Bassae, dated at 427 BC. It is sometimes called the feminine order because it is on the top level of the Colosseum and holding up the least weight, and also has the slenderest ratio of thickness to height. Height to width ratio is about 10:1.

=== Composite order ===
The Composite order draws its name from the capital being a composite of the Ionic and Corinthian capitals. The acanthus of the Corinthian column already has a scroll-like element, so the distinction is sometimes subtle. Generally the Composite is similar to the Corinthian in proportion and employment, often in the upper tiers of colonnades. Height to width ratio is about 11:1 or 12:1.

=== Solomonic ===
A Solomonic column, sometimes called "barley sugar", begins on a base and ends in a capital, which may be of any order, but the shaft twists in a tight spiral, producing a dramatic, serpentine effect of movement. Solomonic columns were developed in the ancient world, but remained rare there. A famous marble set, probably 2nd century, was brought to Old St. Peter's Basilica by Constantine I, and placed round the saint's shrine, and was thus familiar throughout the Middle Ages, by which time they were thought to have been removed from the Temple of Jerusalem. The style was used in bronze by Bernini for his spectacular St. Peter's Baldachin, actually a ciborium (which displaced Constantine's columns), and thereafter became very popular with Baroque and Rococo church architects, above all in Latin America, where they were very often used, especially on a small scale, as they are easy to produce in wood by turning on a lathe (hence also the style's popularity for spindles on furniture and stairs).

=== Caryatid ===
A Caryatid is a sculpted female figure serving as an architectural support taking the place of a column or a pillar supporting an entablature on her head. The Greek term karyatides literally means "maidens of Karyai", an ancient town of Peloponnese.

According to the 1st-century-BC Roman architectural writer Vitruvius, the figures represented the women of Caryae, who were doomed to hard labor because the town sided with the Persians during their invasion of Greece in 480 BC.

=== Engaged columns ===
In architecture, an engaged column is a column embedded in a wall and partly projecting from the surface of the wall, sometimes defined as semi or three-quarter detached. Engaged columns are rarely found in classical Greek architecture, and then only in exceptional cases, but in Roman architecture they exist in abundance, most commonly embedded in the cella walls of pseudoperipteral buildings.

== Pillar tombs ==
Pillar tombs are monumental graves, which typically feature a single, prominent pillar or column, often made of stone. A number of world cultures incorporated pillars into tomb structures. In the ancient Greek colony of Lycia in Anatolia, one of these edifices is located at the tomb of Xanthos. In the town of Hannassa in southern Somalia, ruins of houses with archways and courtyards have also been found along with other pillar tombs, including a rare octagonal tomb.

== Gallery ==
Different columns

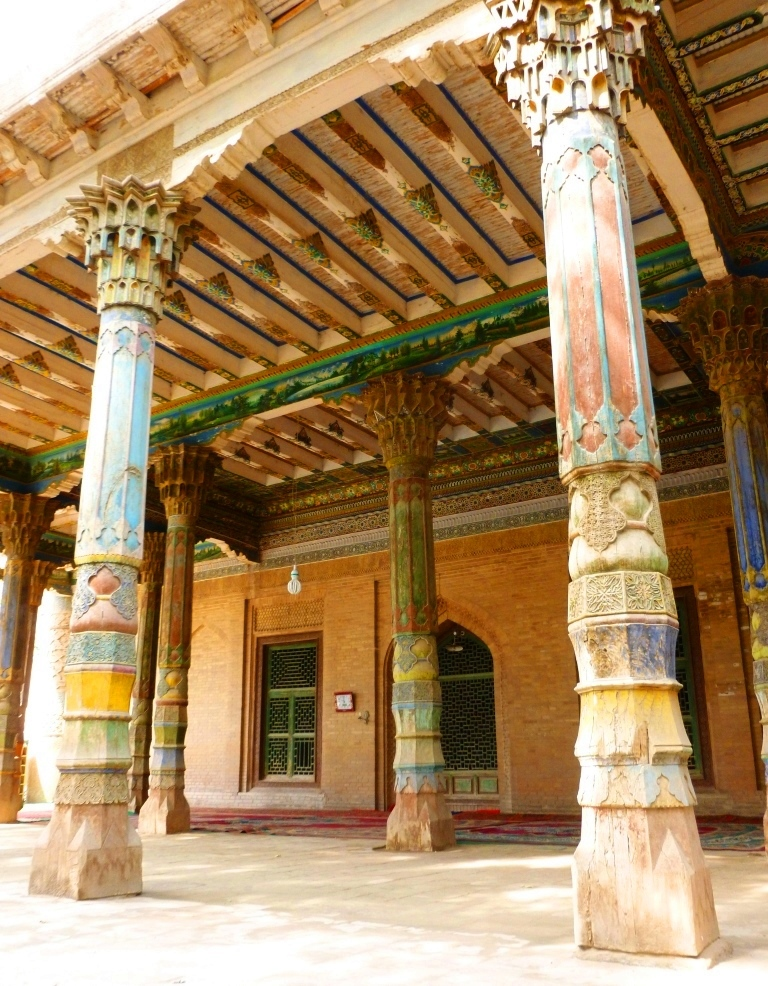
Decorated pillars. Mosque. Kashgar

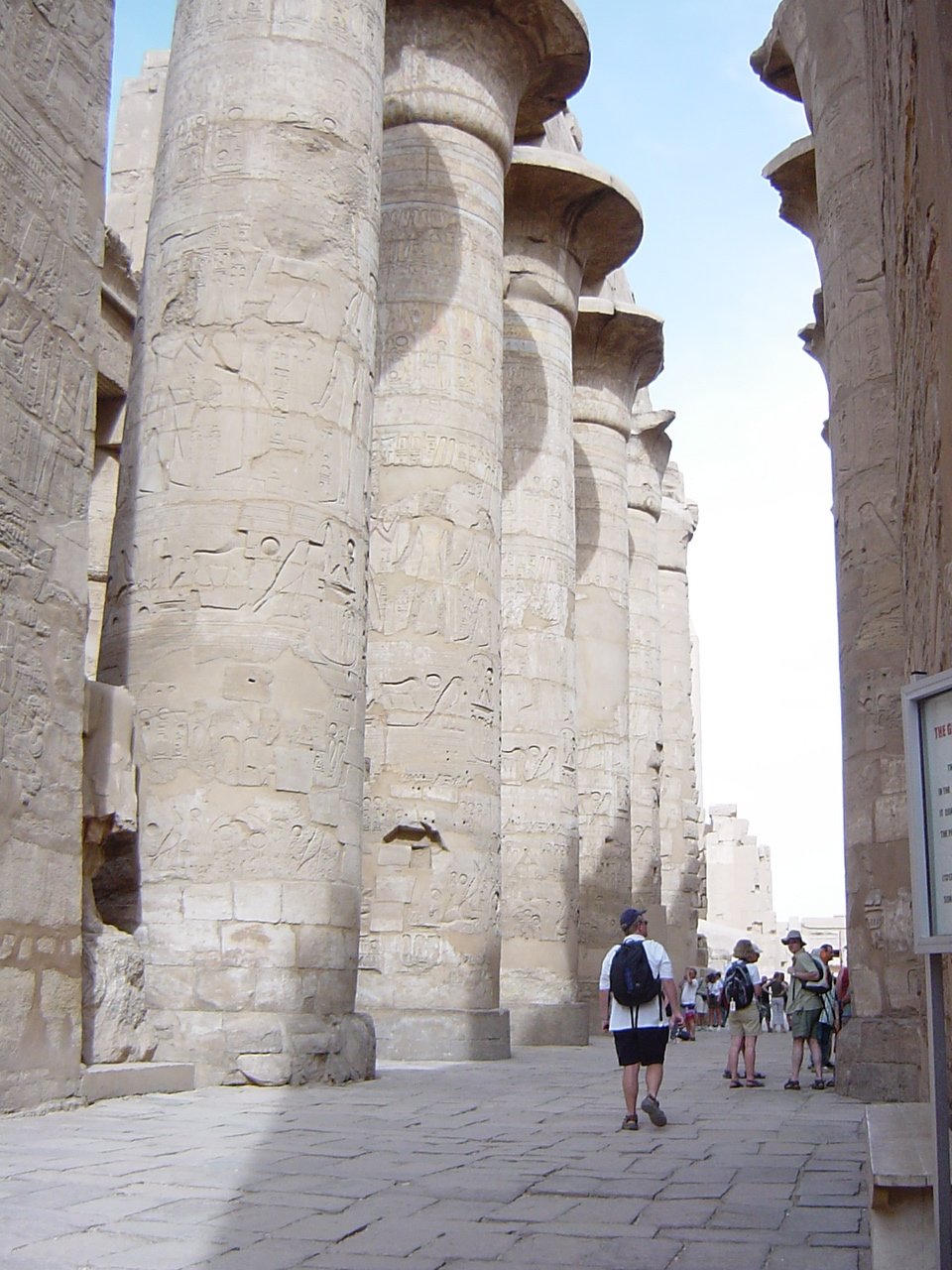
The Great Hypostyle Hall from Karnak (Egypt)

Wooden columns of Changdeokgung in Seoul, Korea

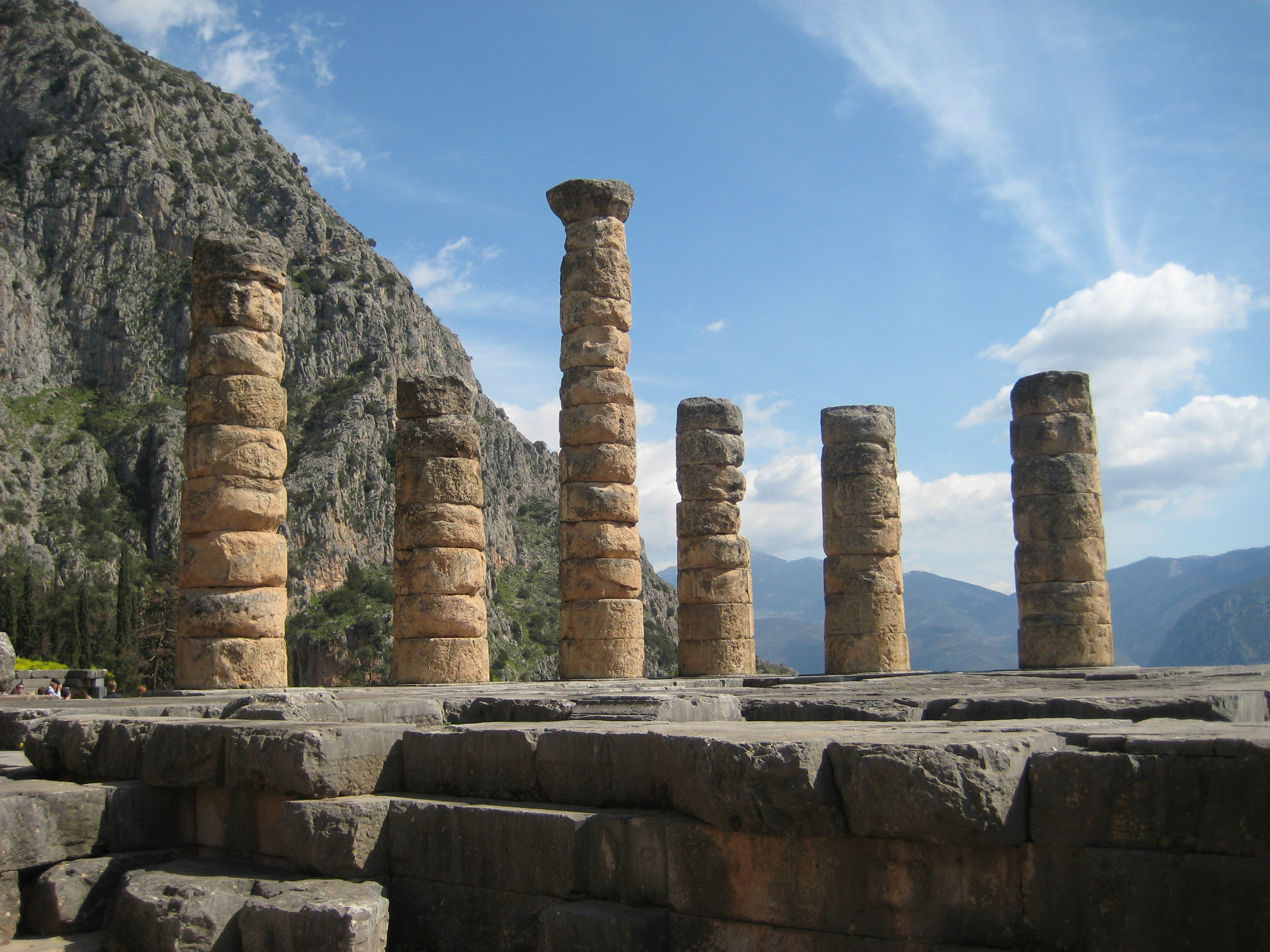
Columns found at the Temple of Apollo in Delphi

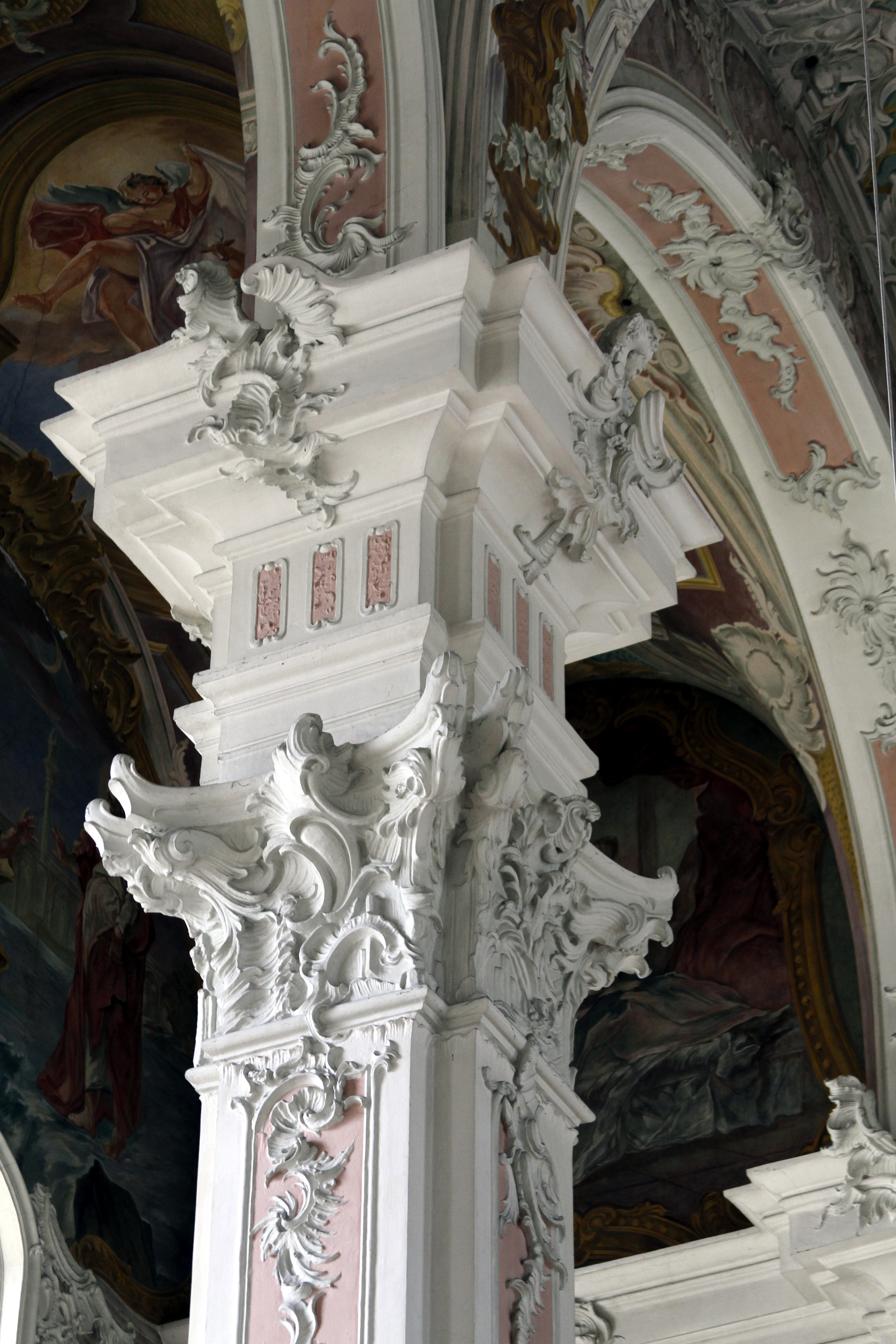
Rococo detail of a column from St. Peter's Church (Mainz, Germany)

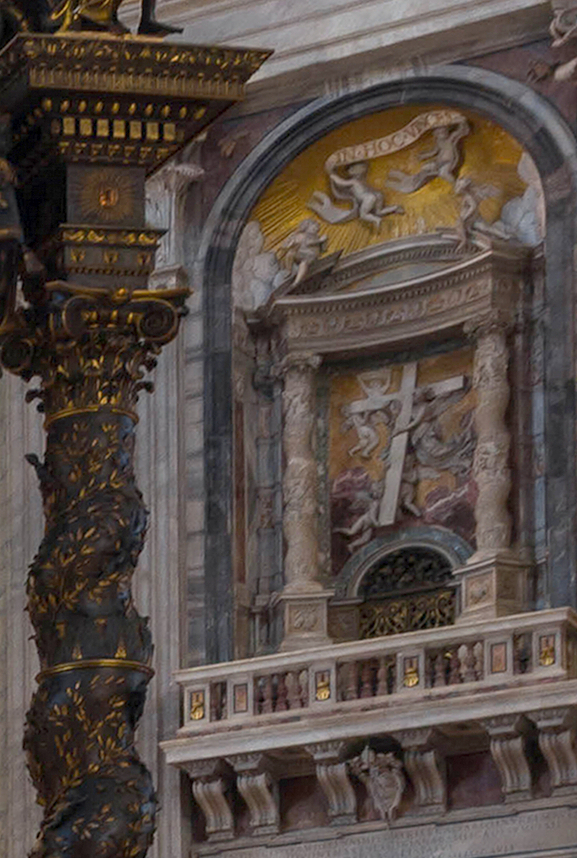
At right, two of the Solomonic columns brought to Rome by Constantine, in their present-day location on a pier in St. Peter's Basilica (Vatican City). In the foreground at left is part of Bernini's St. Peter's Baldachin, inspired by the original columns.

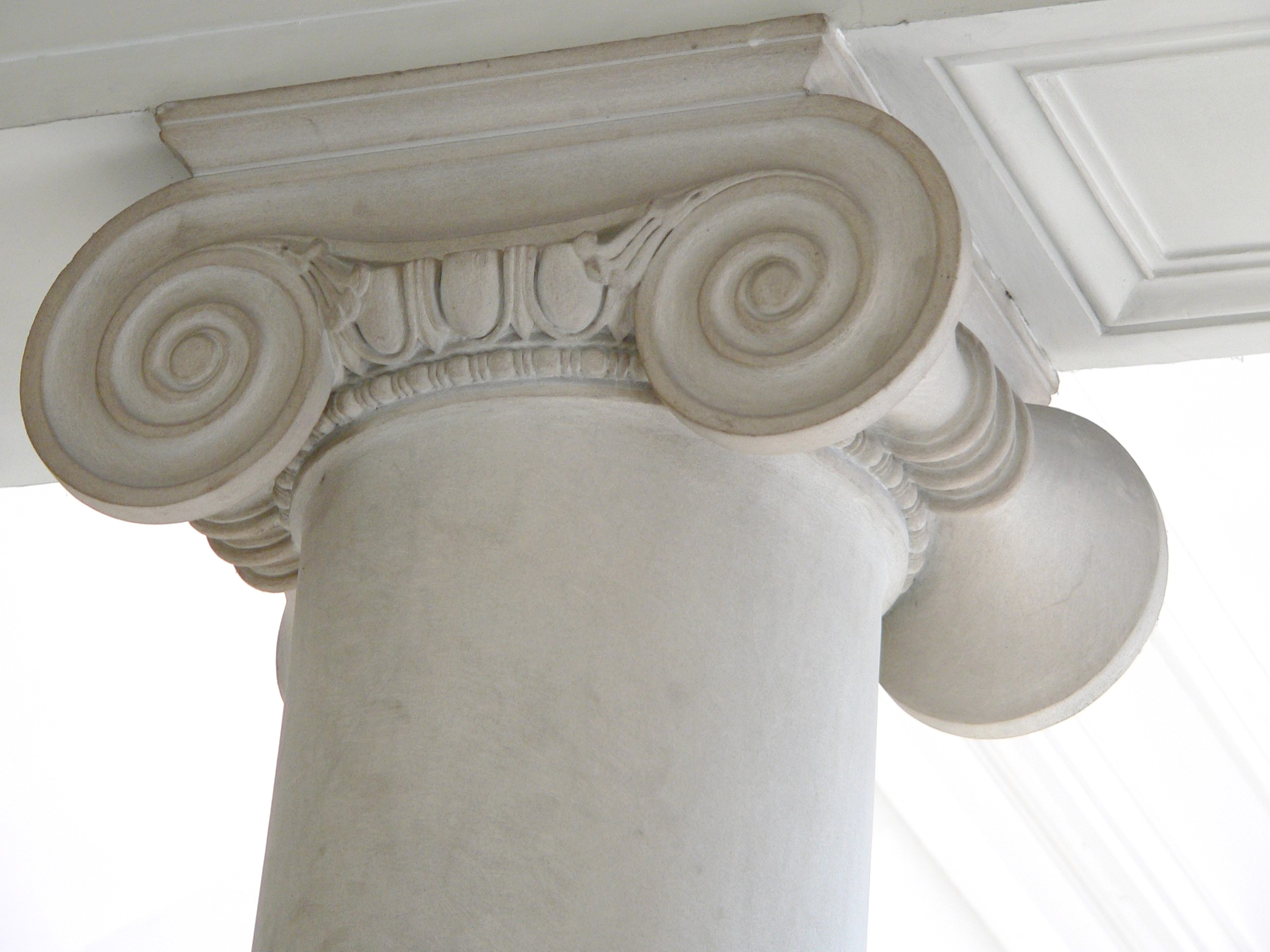
Ionic capital

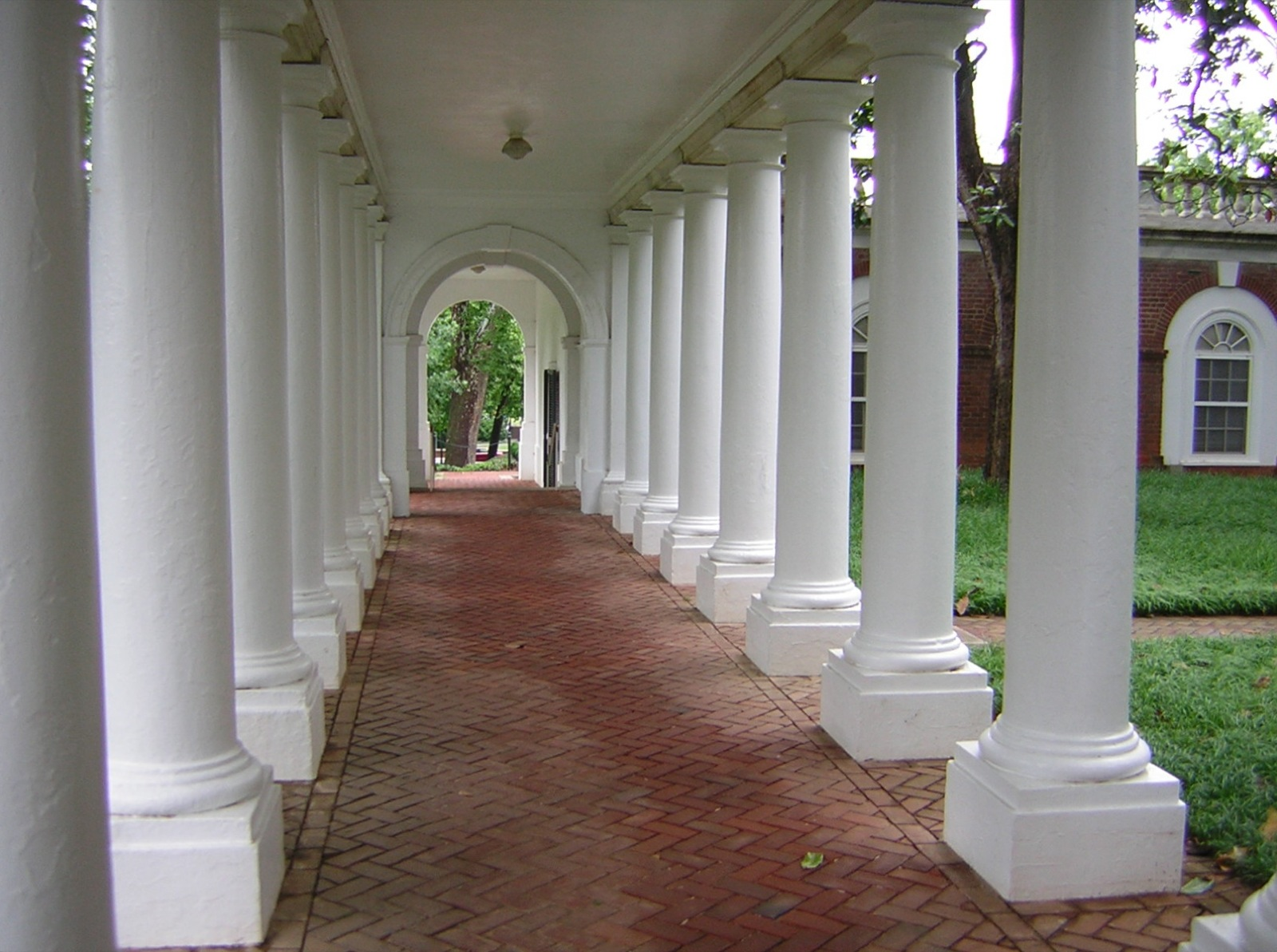
Tuscan columns can be seen at the University of Virginia

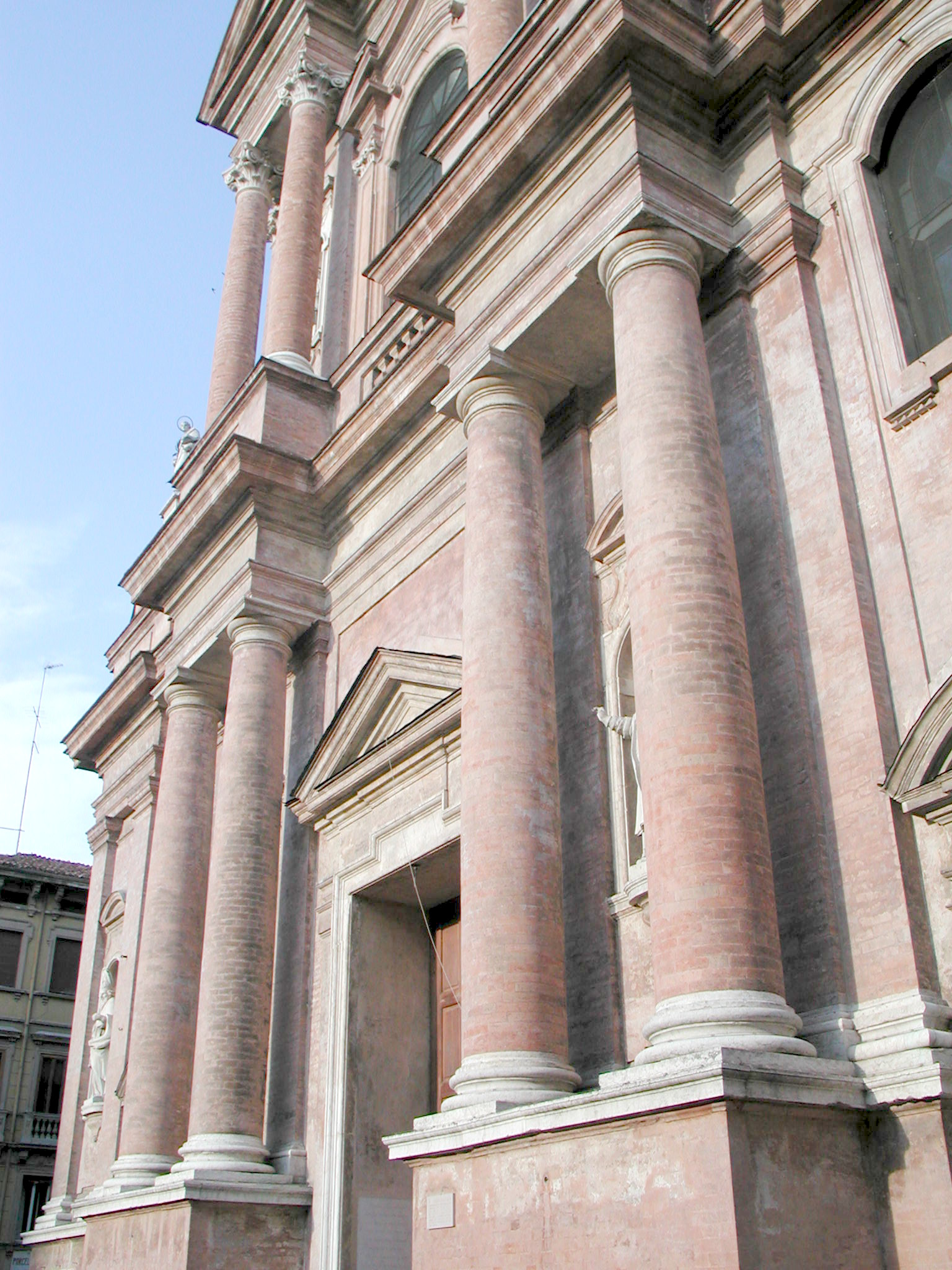
Church of San Prospero (Reggio Emilia, Italy)

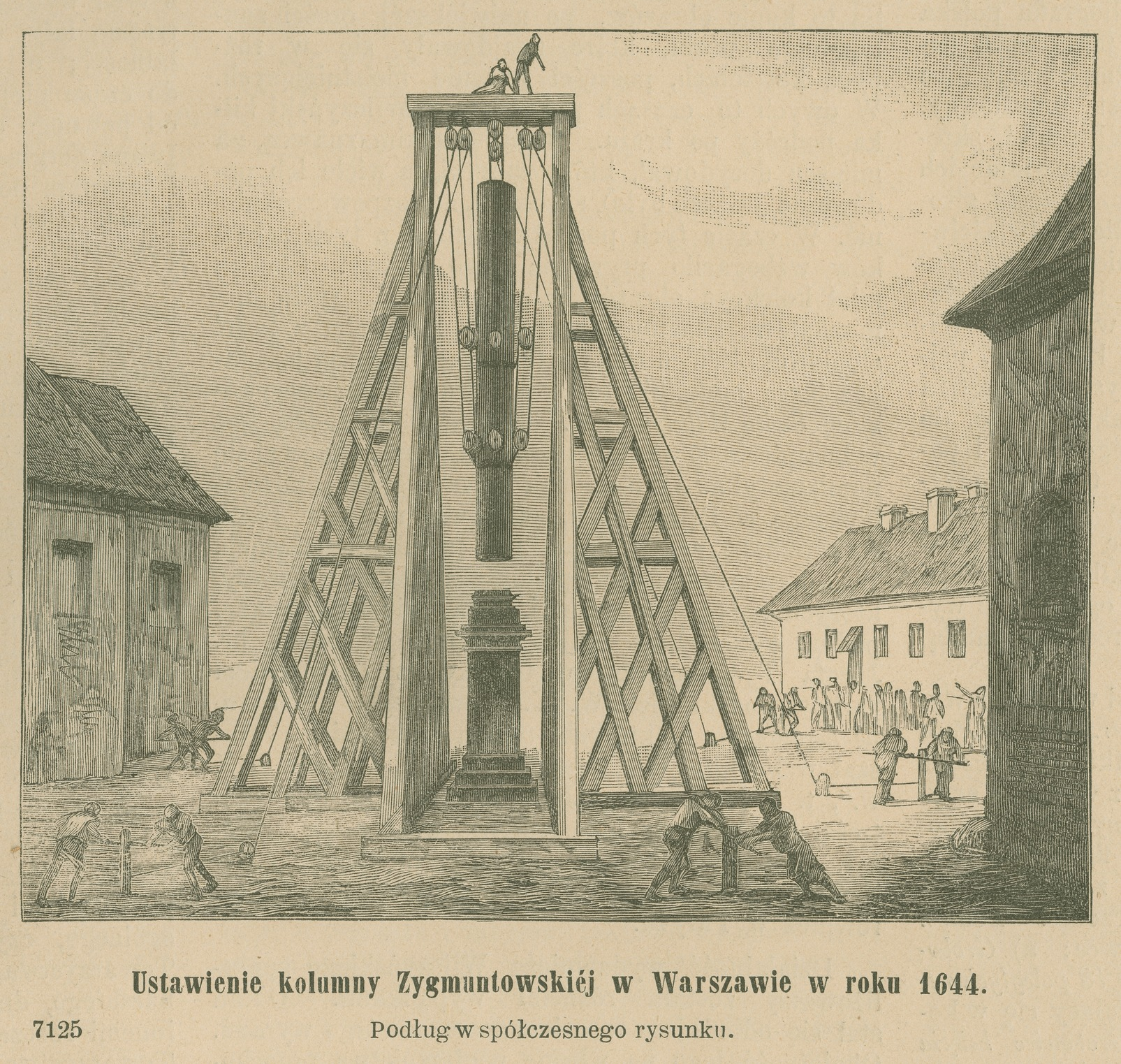
Construction of Sigismund's Column in Warsaw, detail of the 1646 engraving.

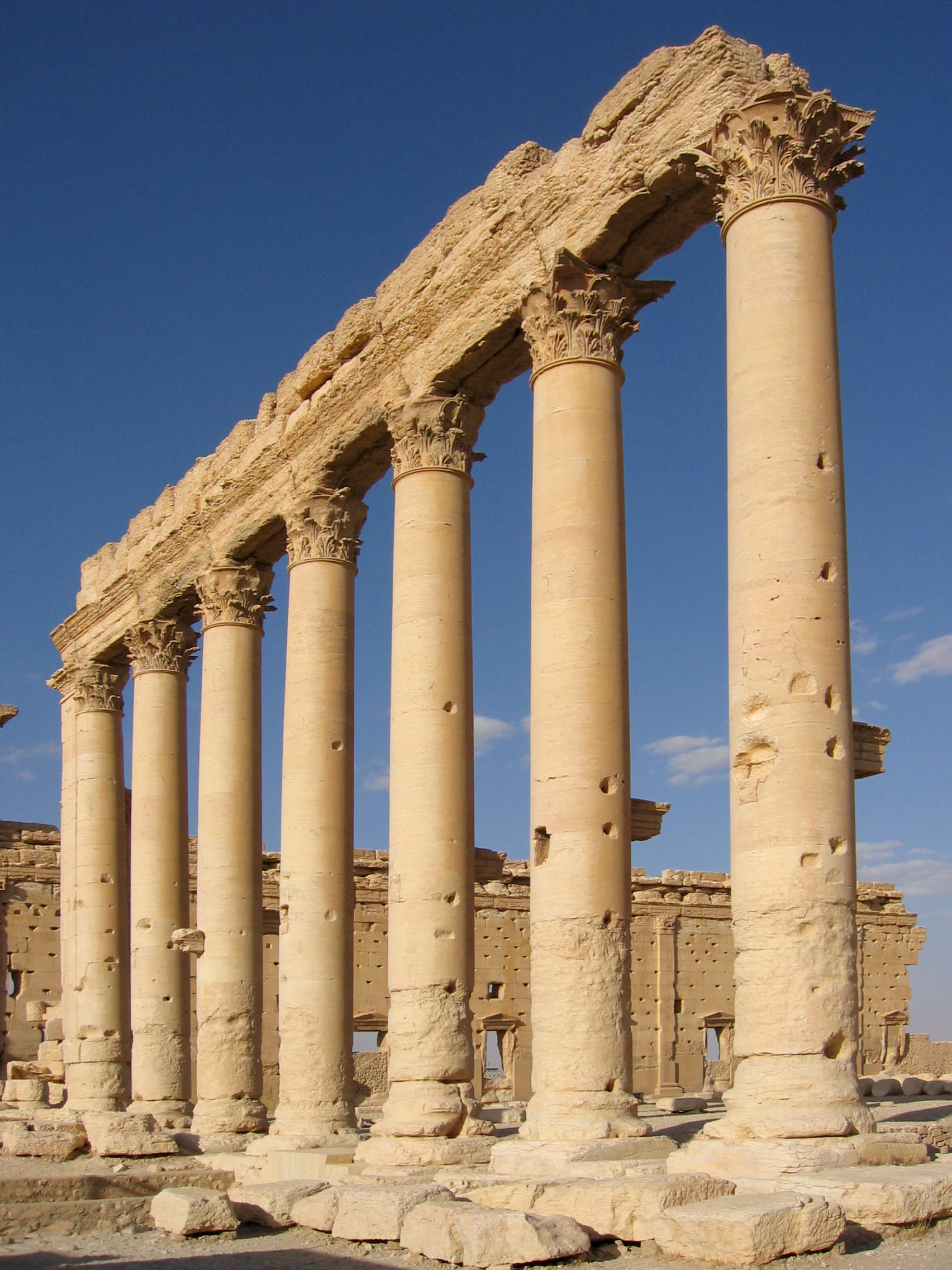
These are composed of stacked segments and finished in the Corinthian style, at the Temple of Bel (Syria)

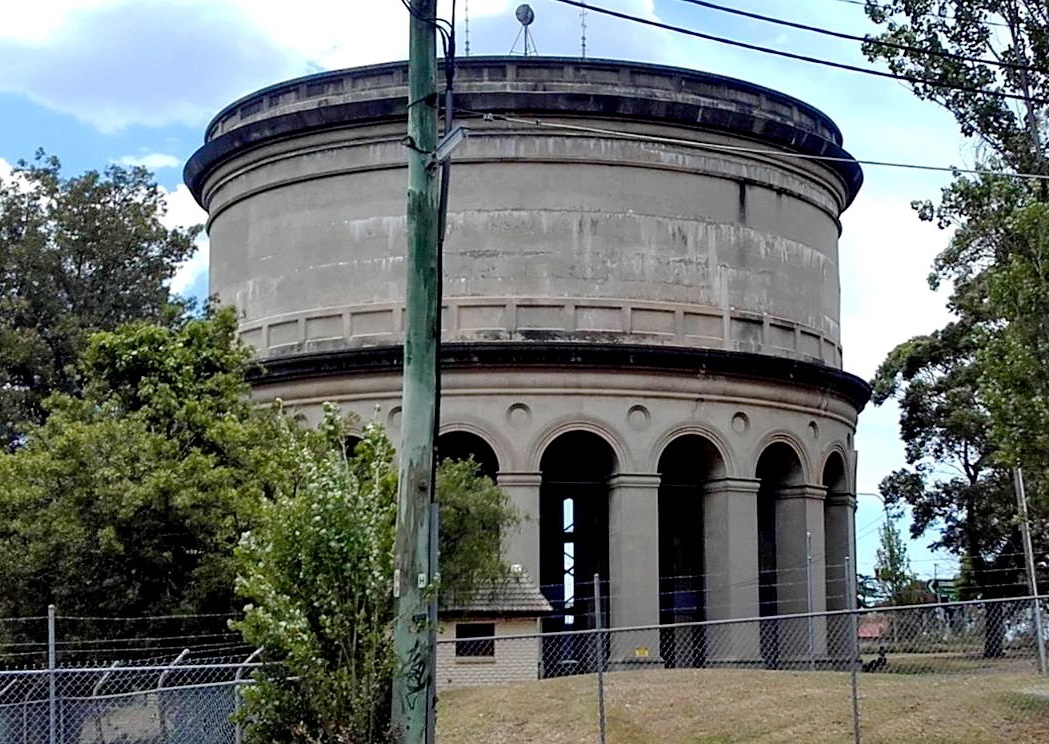
The pillars of Bankstown Reservoir (Sydney, Australia)

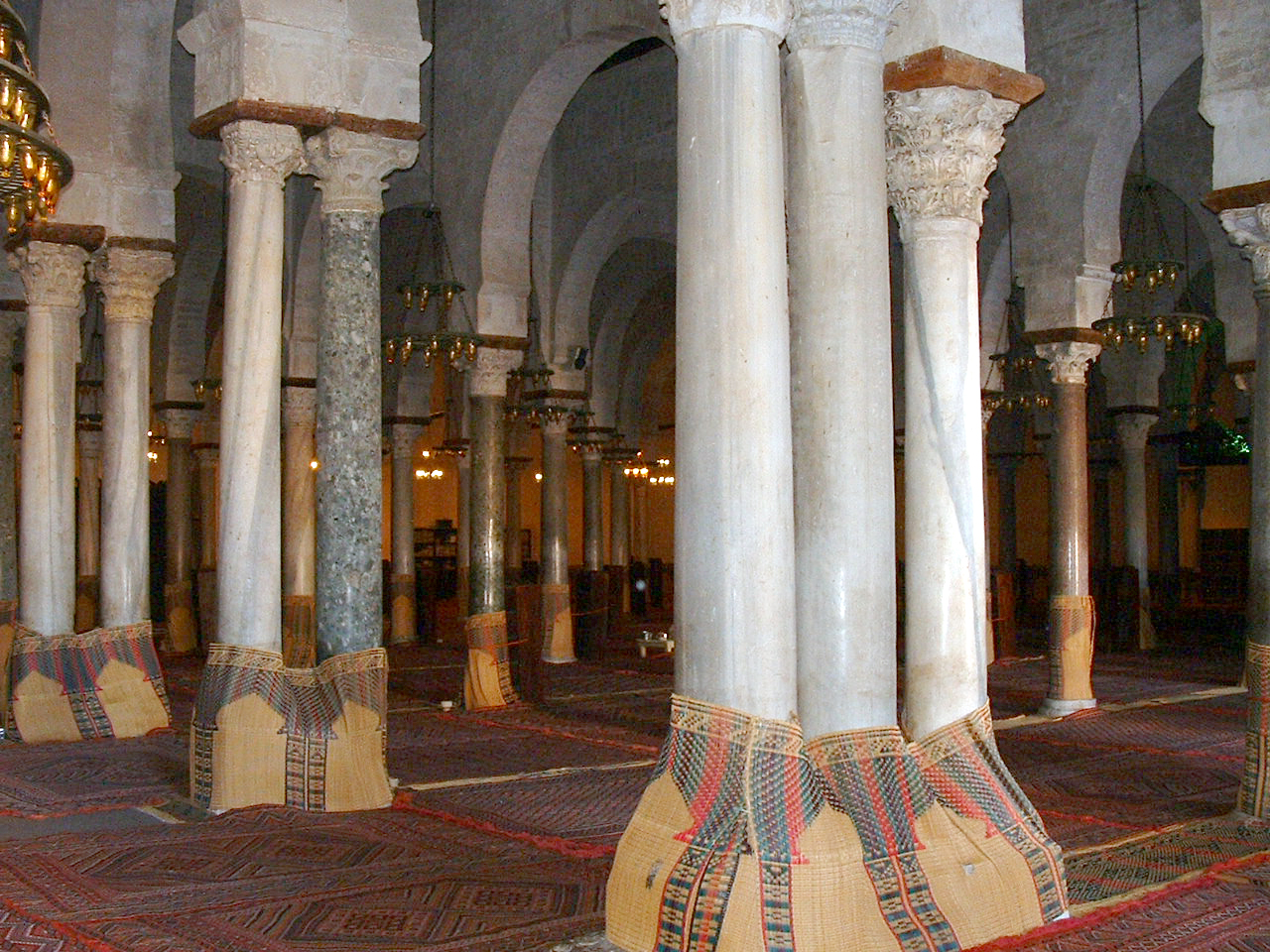
Reused Roman columns and capitals in the Great Mosque of Kairouan

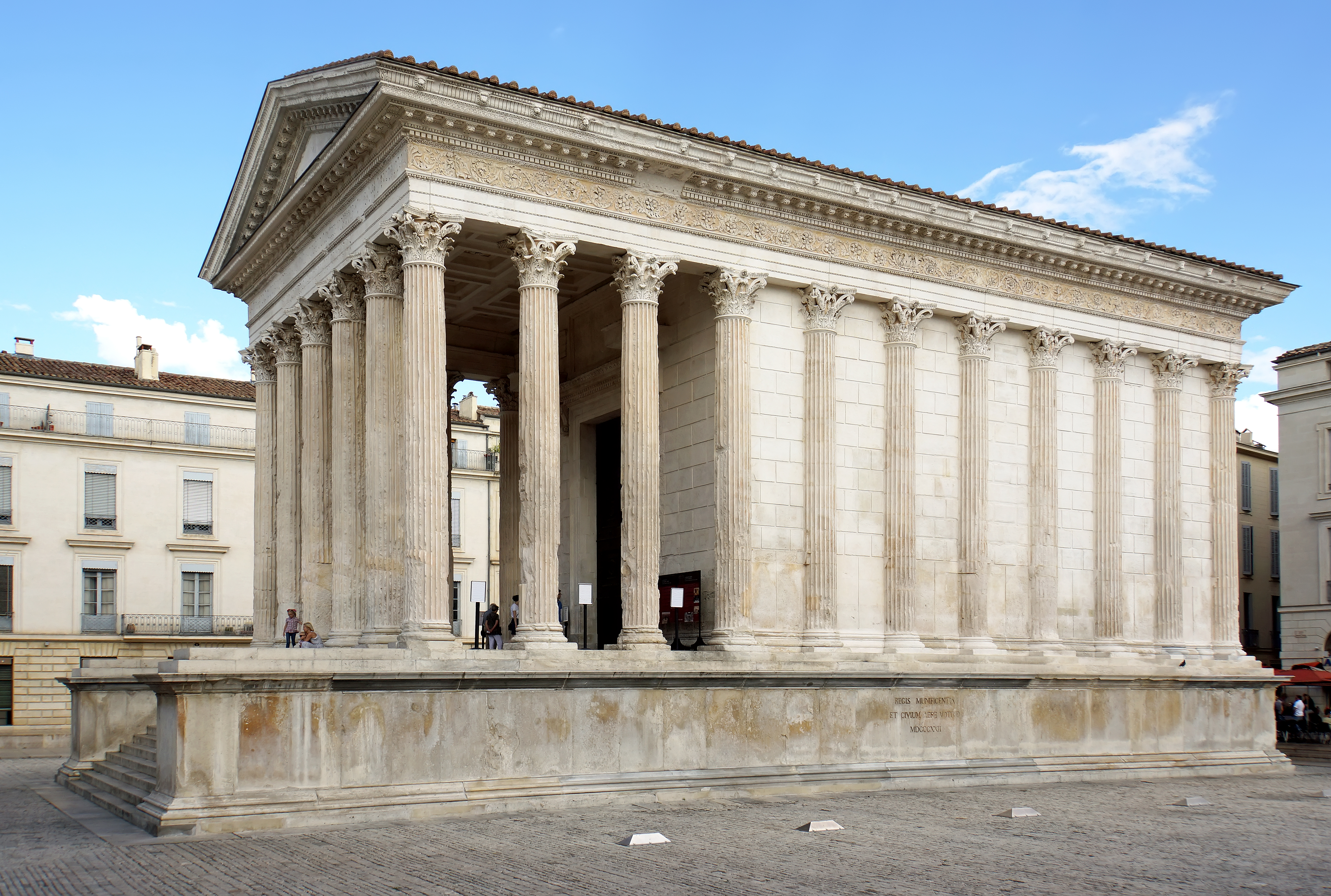
Engaged columns embedded in the side walls of the cella of the Maison Carrée in Nîmes (France)

== See also ==
- Columnar jointing (geology)
- Core (architecture)
- Huabiao
- Linga
- Lingodbhava
- Load-bearing wall
- Marian and Holy Trinity columns
- Our Lady of the Pillar
- Post (structural)
- Pylon (architecture)
- Spur (architecture)
- Structural engineering
- Votive Column of Lisieux

== Sources ==
- Chisholm, Hugh, ed. (1911). "Engaged Column". Encyclopædia Britannica. 9 (11th ed.). Cambridge University Press. pp. 404–405.
- Stierlin, Henri. The Roman Empire: From the Etruscans to the Decline of the Roman Empire, TASCHEN, 2002
- Alderman, Liz (7 July 2014). "Acropolis Maidens Glow Anew". The New York Times. Retrieved 9 July 2014.
- Stokstad, Marilyn; Cothren, Michael (2014). Art History (Volume 1 ed.). New Jersey: Pearson Education, Inc. p. 110.
