= Mesoamerican architecture =

Building traditions of pre-Columbian Mesoamerica

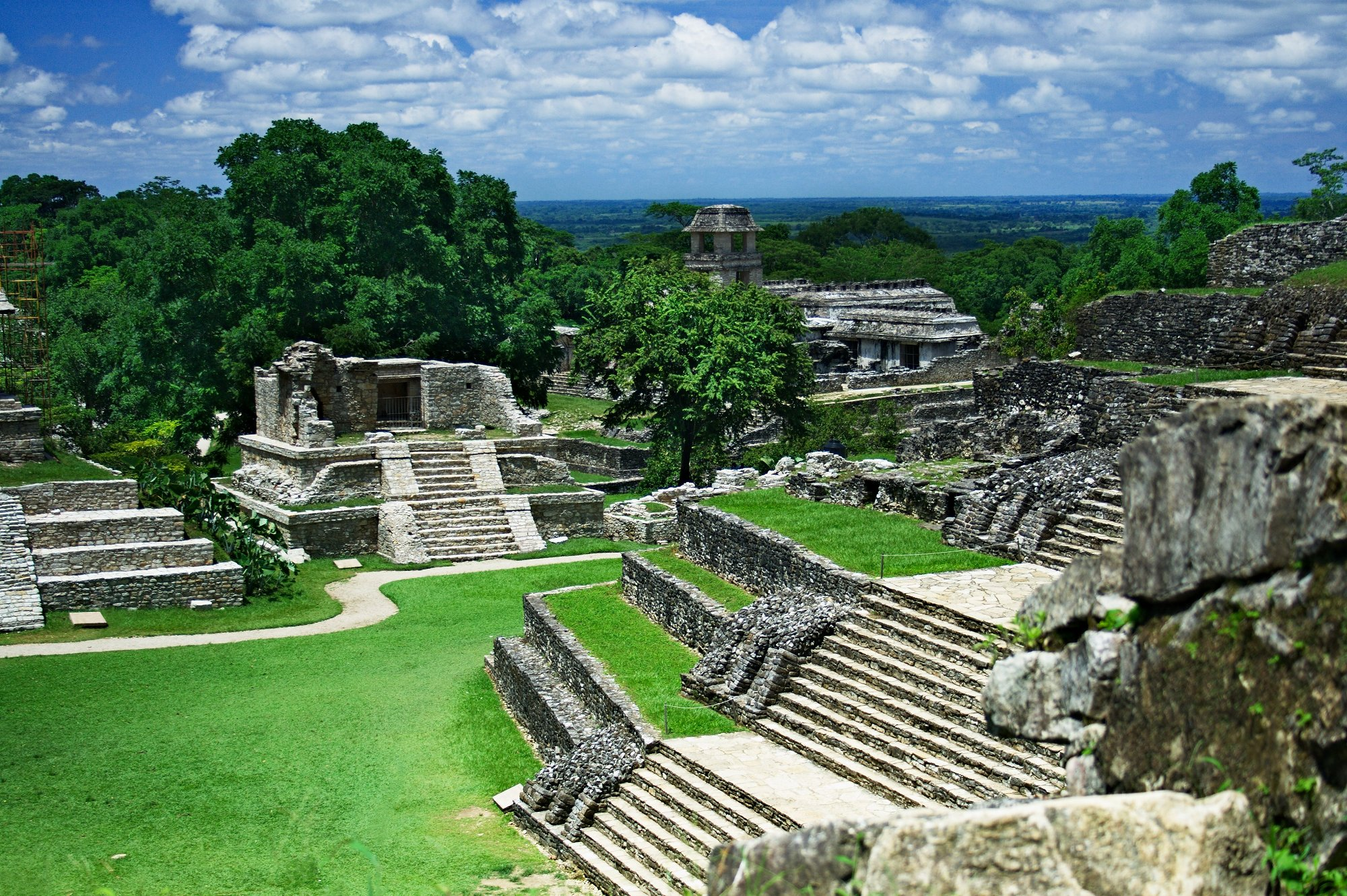
Overview of the central plaza of the Maya city of Palenque (Chiapas, Mexico), an example of Classic period Mesoamerican architecture

Mesoamerican architecture is the set of architectural traditions produced by pre-Columbian cultures and civilizations of Mesoamerica, traditions which are best known in the form of public, ceremonial and urban monumental buildings and structures. The distinctive features of Mesoamerican architecture encompass a number of different regional and historical styles, which however are significantly interrelated. These styles developed throughout the different phases of Mesoamerican history as a result of the intensive cultural exchange between the different cultures of the Mesoamerican culture area through thousands of years. Mesoamerican architecture is mostly noted for its pyramids, which are the largest such structures outside of Ancient Egypt.

One interesting and widely researched topic is the relation between cosmovision, religion, geography, and architecture in Mesoamerica. Much seems to suggest that many traits of Mesoamerican architecture were governed by religious and mythological ideas. For example, the layout of most Mesoamerican cities seem to be influenced by the cardinal directions and their mythological and symbolic meanings in Mesoamerican culture.

Another part of Mesoamerican architecture is its iconography. The monumental architecture of Mesoamerica was decorated with images of religious and cultural significance, and also in many cases with writing in some of the Mesoamerican writing systems. Iconographic decorations and texts on buildings are important contributors to the overall current knowledge of pre-Columbian Mesoamerican society, history and religion.

== Chronology ==
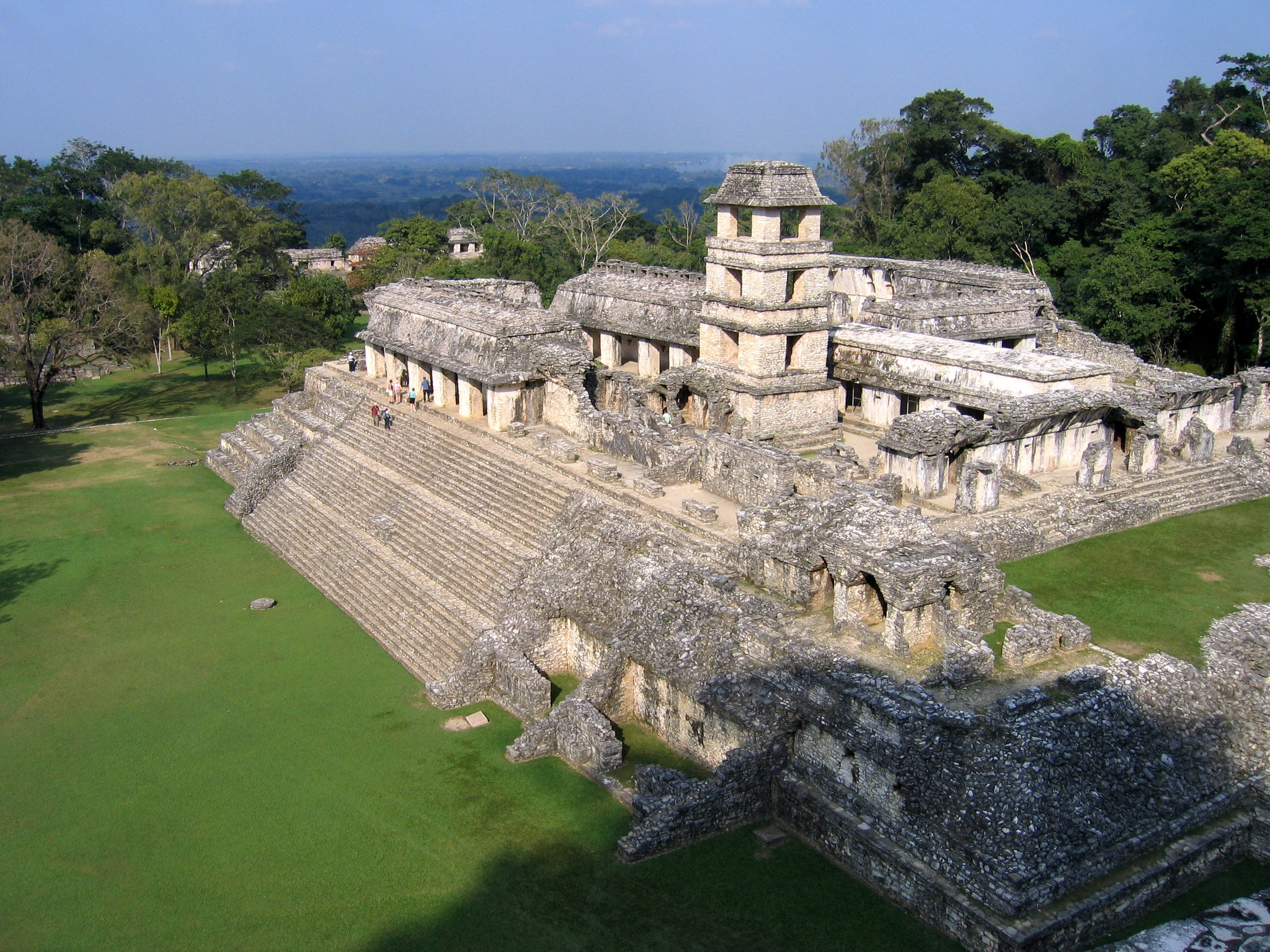
The Palace in Palenque

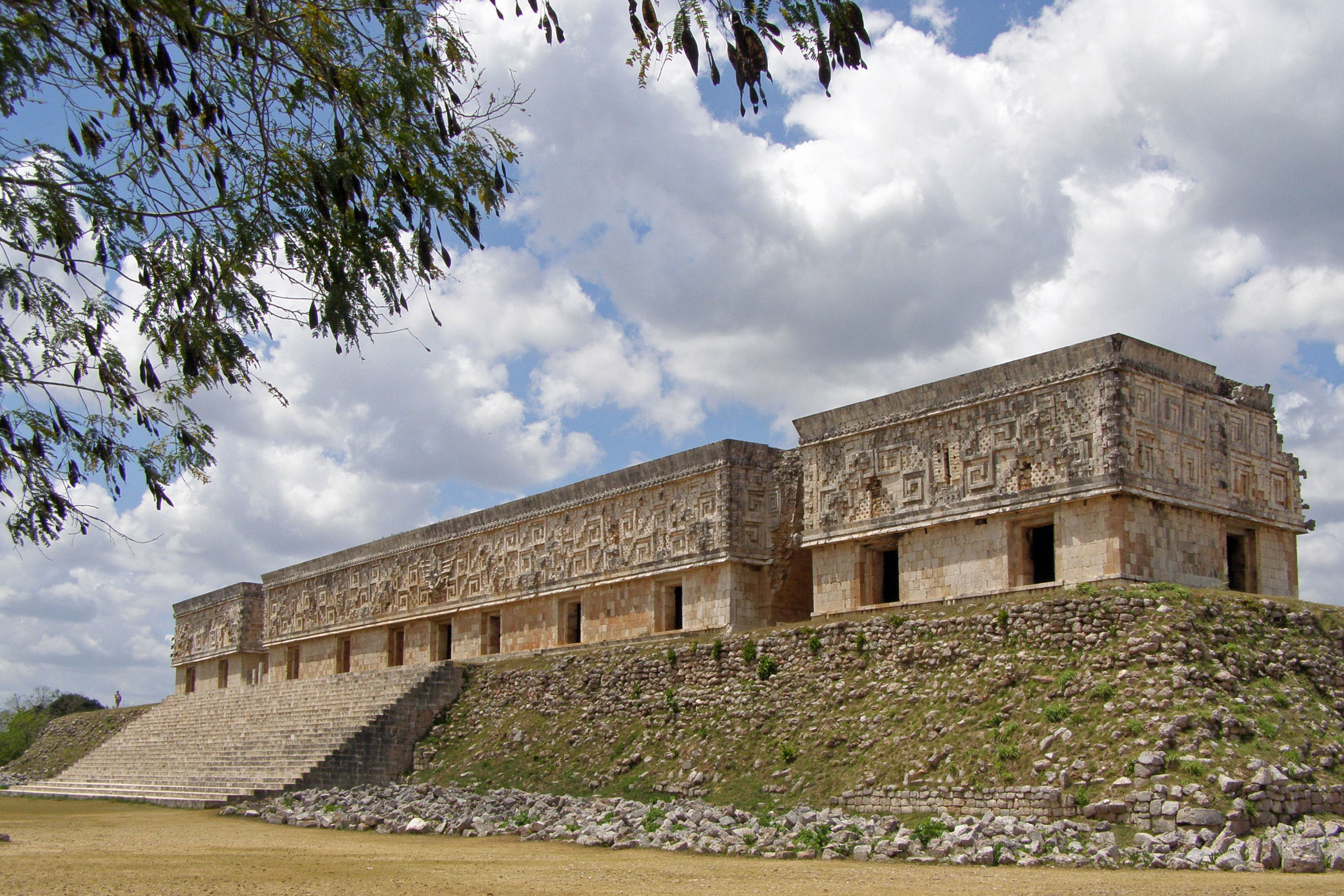
Governor's Palace, Uxmal

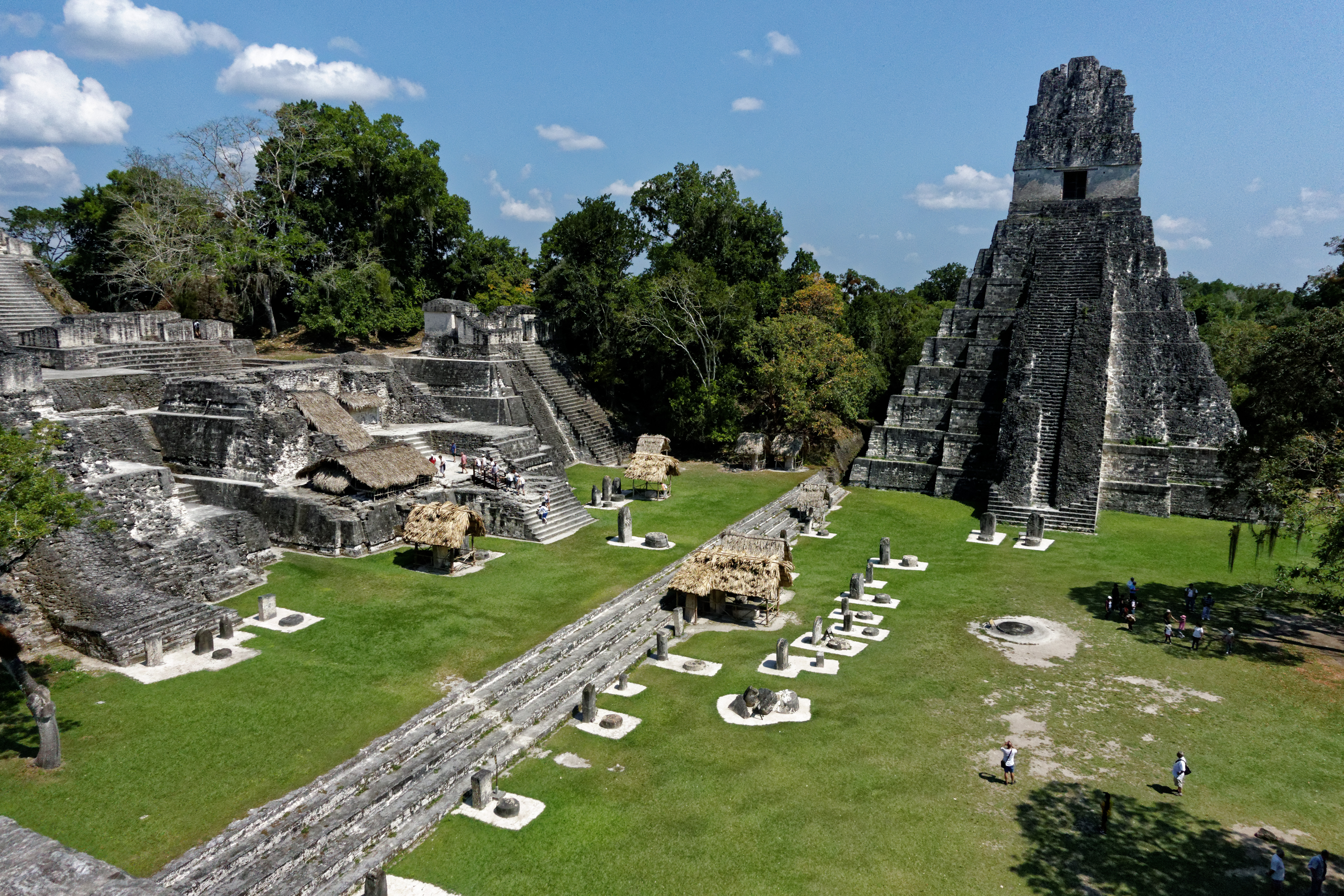
Tikal

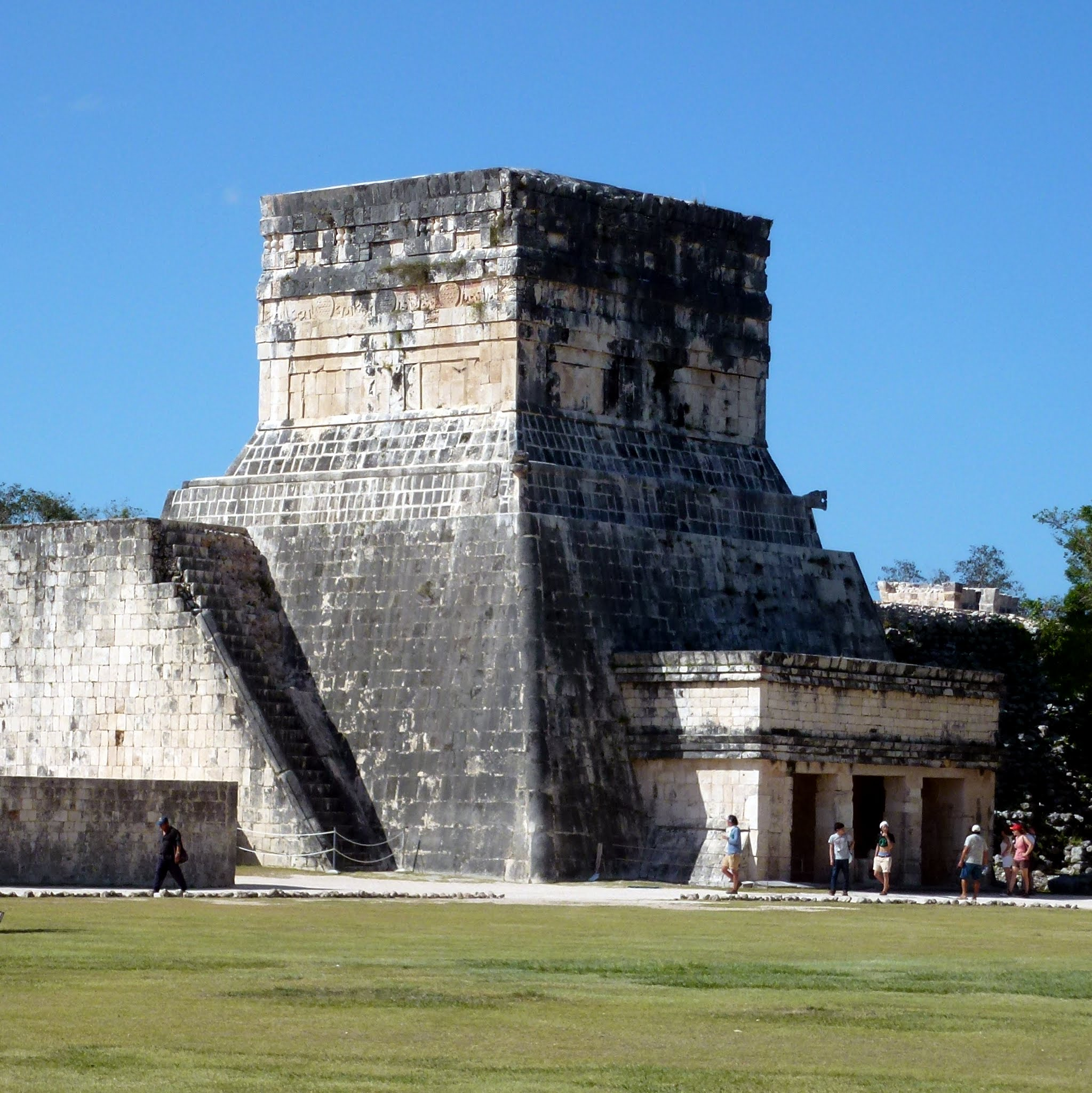
Chichen Itza, Great Ball Court, Temple of the Jaguars

The following tables show the different phases of Mesoamerican architecture and archeology and correlates them with the cultures, cities, styles and specific buildings that are notable from each period.

Period	Timespan	Important cultures, cities, structures and styles
Pre-Classic(Formative)	BC 2000–1000	Gulf Coast cultures, Olmec, Monte Alto Culture
Early Pre-Classic	BC 2000–1000	Olmec centers San Lorenzo Tenochtitlan, Chalcatzingo, San José Mogote, La Mojarra Steala 12
Middle Pre-Classic	BC 1000–400	Late Olmec and Early Maya, Izapa, La Venta, Tres Zapotes, Usulután ceramics, Nakbé, Lamanai, Xunantunich Naj Tunich Cave, El Mirador, Kaminaljuyú
Late Pre-Classic	BC 400 – 200 AD	Preclassic Maya, Teotihuacan and Zapotec, Teuchitlan Tradition formative periods, Teotihuacan, Uaxactún, Tikal, Edzná, Monte Albán I & II, Pyramid of the Sun, Guachimontones
Classic	AD 200–900	Classic Maya Centers, Teotihuacan, Zapotecs, Teuchitlan Tradition
Early Classic	AD 200–600	Teotihuacan apogee, Monte Albán III, Palenque, Copán, Classic Veracruz culture, Talud-tablero, Hieroglyphic stairs of Copán, Tomb of Pacal the Great,
Late Classic	AD 600–900	Xochicalco, Cacaxtla, Cancuen, Quiriguá, Uxmal, Toniná, Classic Veracruz Culture, Puuc style, Rio Bec style, Cobá, Yaxchilan Lintel 24
Post-Classic	AD 900–1519	Maya Itzá, Chichen Itza, Mayapan, Tayasal, and Kowoj Topoxte, Toltec, Purépecha, Mixtec, Totonac
Early Post-Classic	AD 900–1200	Cholula, Tula, Mitla, El Tajín, Tulum, Kaminaljuyú
Late Post-Classic	AD 1200–1519	Aztec, Tenochtitlan, Templo Mayor, Tzintzuntzan, Quiché Utatlán, Kaqchikel Iximche and Mam Zaculeu, Maya, Utatlán, Cempoala

== Urban planning and cosmovision ==
=== Cosmos and its replication ===
==== Symbolism ====
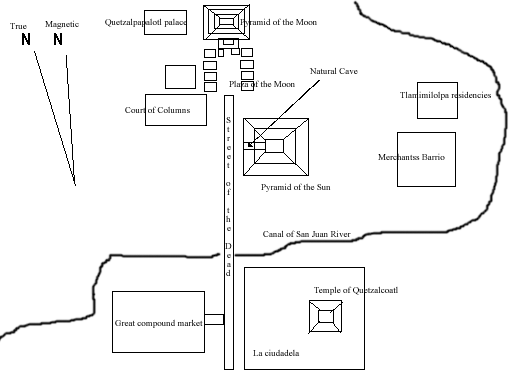
The layout of the city of Teotihuacan. The central part of the city is laid out following a north/south axis aligned about 15.5 degrees off, and which is marked by the "Street of the dead". The pyramid of the sun is in the center, built on an artificial cave. The southern part is skewed about 16.5 degrees east of north, following the orientation of the Ciudadela, mostly surrounded by residential quarters, while the northern part is the ceremonial center used for among other things human sacrifice.

An important part of the Mesoamerican religious system was replicating their beliefs in concrete tangible forms, in effect making the world an embodiment of their beliefs. This meant that the Mesoamerican city was constructed to be a microcosm, manifesting the same division that existed in the religious, mythical geography—a division between the underworld and the human world. The underworld was represented by the direction north and many structures and buildings related to the underworld, such as tombs, are often found in the city's northern half. The southern part represented life, sustenance, and rebirth and often contained structures related to the continuity and daily function of the city-state, such as monuments depicting the noble lineages, or residential quarters, markets, etc. Between the two halves of the north/south axis was the plaza, often containing stelae resembling the world tree the Mesoamerican axis mundi, and a ballcourt which served as a crossing point between the two worlds.

Some Mesoamericanists argue that in religious symbolism the Mesoamerican monumental architecture pyramids were mountains, stelae were trees, and wells, ballcourts and cenotes were caves that provided access to the underworld.

==== Orientation ====
Mesoamerican architecture is often designed to align to specific celestial events. Some pyramids, temples, and other structures were designed to achieve special lighting effects on particular days important in the Mesoamerican cosmovision. A famous example is the "El Castillo" pyramid at Chichen Itza, where a light-and-shadow effect can be observed during several weeks around the equinoxes. Contrary to a common opinion, however, there is no evidence that this phenomenon was the result of a purposeful design intended to commemorate the equinoxes.

Much Mesoamerican architecture is also aligned to roughly 15° east of north. Vincent H Malmstrom has argued that this is because of a general wish to align the pyramids to face the sunset on August 13, which was the beginning date of the Maya Long Count calendar. However, recent research has shown that the earliest orientations marking sunsets on August 13 (and April 30) occur outside of the Maya area. Their purpose must have been to record the dates separated by a period of 260 days (from August 13 to April 30), equivalent to the length of the sacred Mesoamerican calendrical count. In general, the orientations in Mesoamerican architecture tend to mark the dates separated by multiples of 13 and 20 days, i.e. of basic periods of the calendrical system. The distribution of these dates in the year suggests that the orientations allowed the use of observational calendars that facilitated the prediction of agriculturally significant dates. These conclusions are supported by the results of systematic research accomplished in various Mesoamerican regions, including central Mexico, the Maya Lowlands, Oaxaca, the Gulf Coast lowlands, and western and northern Mesoamerica. While solar orientations prevail, some prominent buildings were aligned to Venus extremes, a notable example being the Governor's Palace at Uxmal. Orientations to lunar standstill positions on the horizon have also been documented; they are particularly common along the Northeast Coast of the Yucatán peninsula, where the worship of the goddess Ixchel, associated with the Moon, is known to have had an outstanding importance during the Postclassic period.

=== The Plaza ===
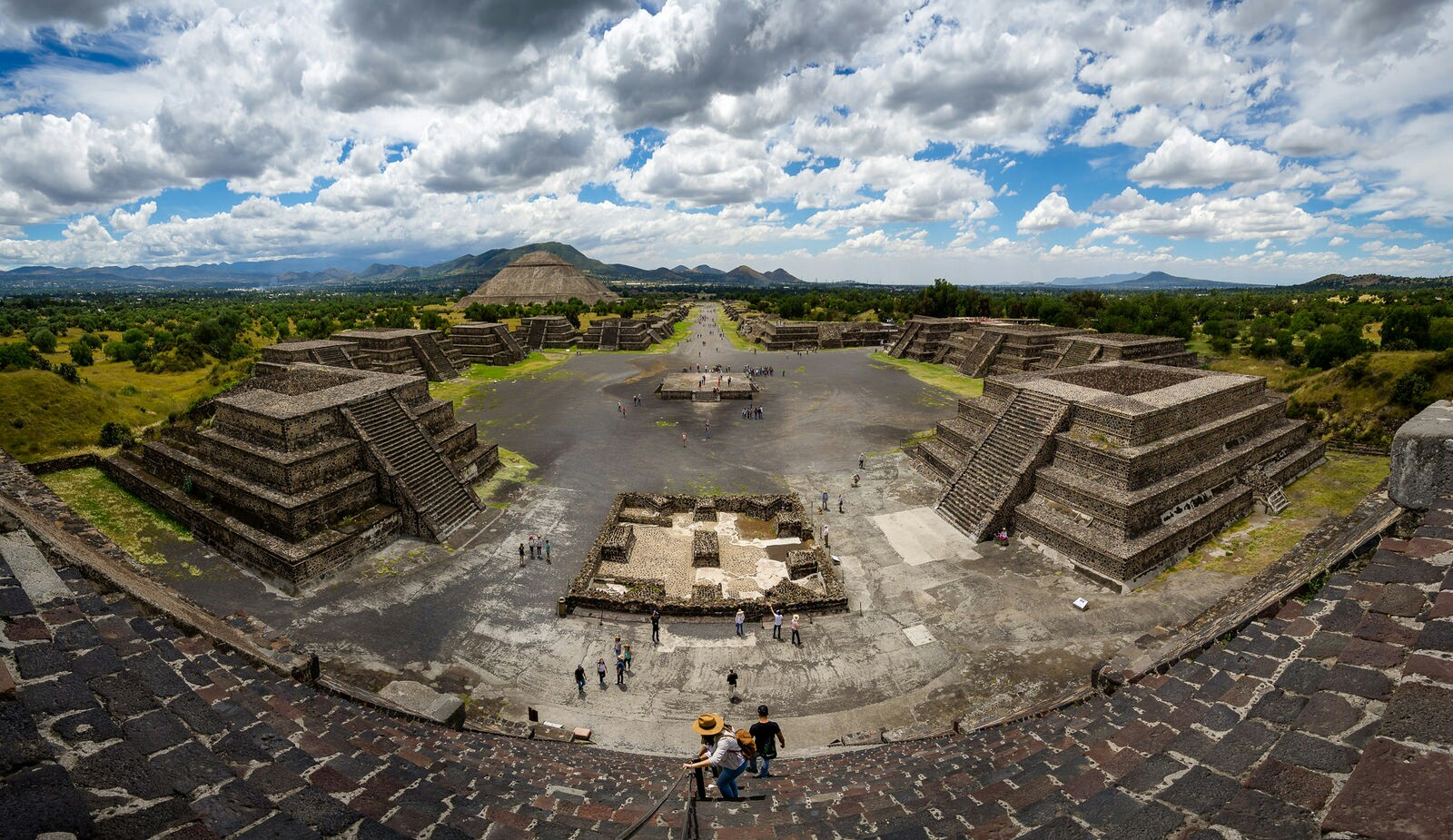
View of the main plaza in Teotihuacan

Nearly every known ancient Mesoamerican city had one or more formal public plazas. They are typically large impressive spaces, surrounded by tall pyramids, temples, and other important buildings. Activities that would take place in these plazas would include private rituals, periodic markets, mass spectator ceremonies, participatory public ceremonies, feasts, and other popular celebrations.

The size of the main plazas in Mesoamerican cities differed greatly, the largest being located in Tenochtitlan with an estimated size of 115,000 square meters. This plaza is an outlier due to the population of the city being so large. The next largest estimated plaza is located in the Gulf Coast in the city of Cempoala (or Zempoala), measuring at 48,088 square meters. Most plazas average at around 3,000 square meters, the smallest being at the site of Paxte which is 528 square meters. Some cities contain many smaller plazas throughout, while some focus their attention on a significantly large main plaza.

==== Tenochtitlan ====
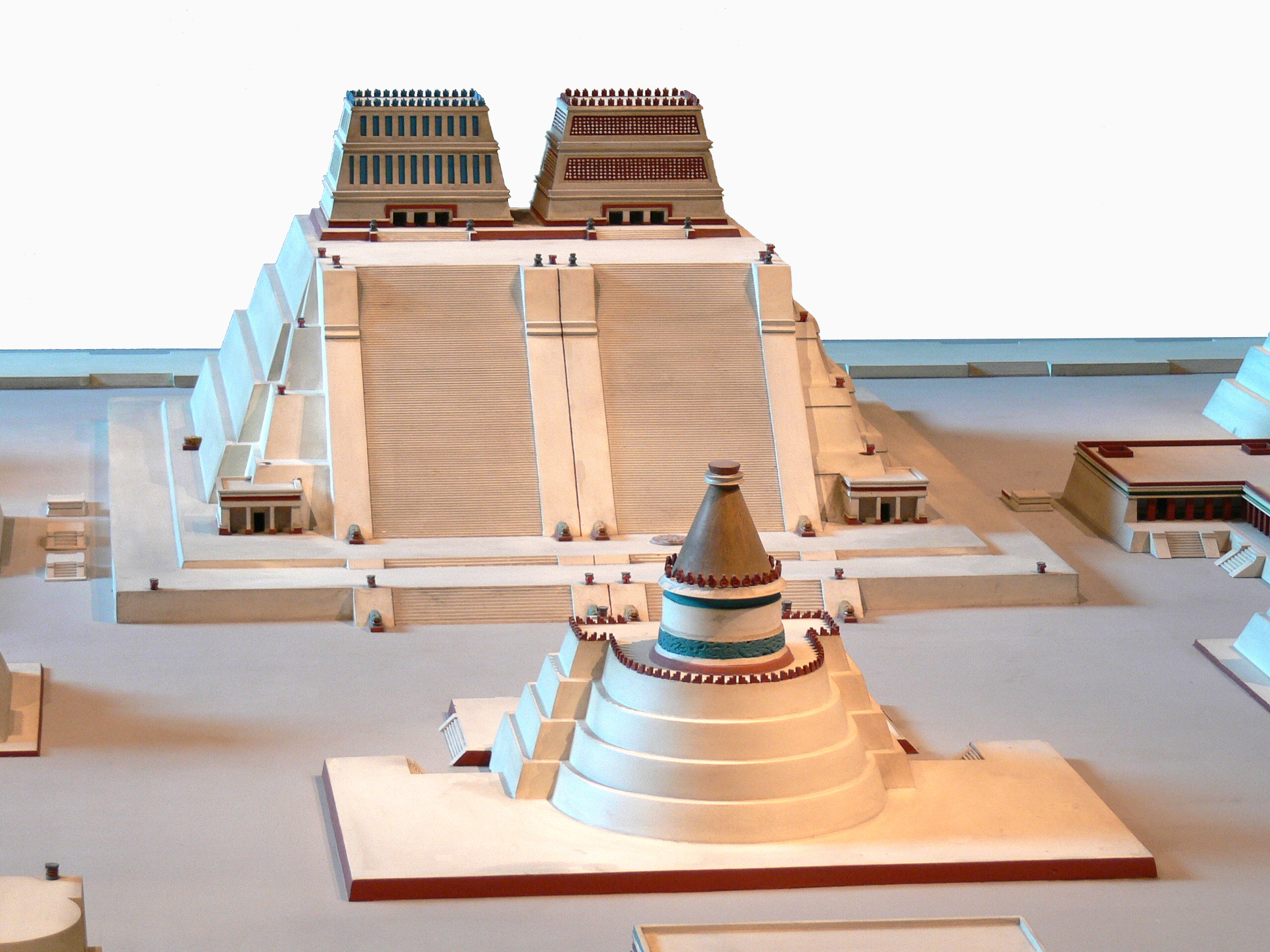
Reconstructed scale model of the Great Temple of Tenochtitlan

Tenochtitlan was an Aztec city that thrived from 1325 to 1521. The city was built on an island, surrounded on all sides by Lake Texcoco. It consisted of an elaborate system of canals, aqueducts, and causeways allowing the city to supply its residents. The island was about 12 square kilometers and had a population of approximately 125,000 people, making it the largest Mesoamerican city ever recorded. The main plaza of Tenochtitlan was approximately 115,000 square meters, or 11.5 ha (28 acres). The main temple of Tenochtitlan known as Templo Mayor or the Great Temple was 100 meters by 80 meters at its base, and 60 meters tall. The city ultimately fell in 1521 when it was destroyed by the Spanish conquistador Hernán Cortés in 1521. Cortés and the Spaniards raided the city for its gold supply and artifacts, leaving little behind of the Aztec's civilization.

At the monumental Templo Mayor of Tenochtitlan, archaeologists discovered that the Aztec enlarged the temple seven times, with five extra façades, but always kept intact the basic dual symbolism of the rain god Tlaloc and the tribute/war god Huitzilopochtli. Mexican Archaeologist Eduardo Matos Moctezuma has shown that the symbolic and ritual life of this imperial shrine unified the patterns of forced tributary payments from hundreds of communities with the agricultural and hydraulic subsystems of food production.

=== Pyramids ===
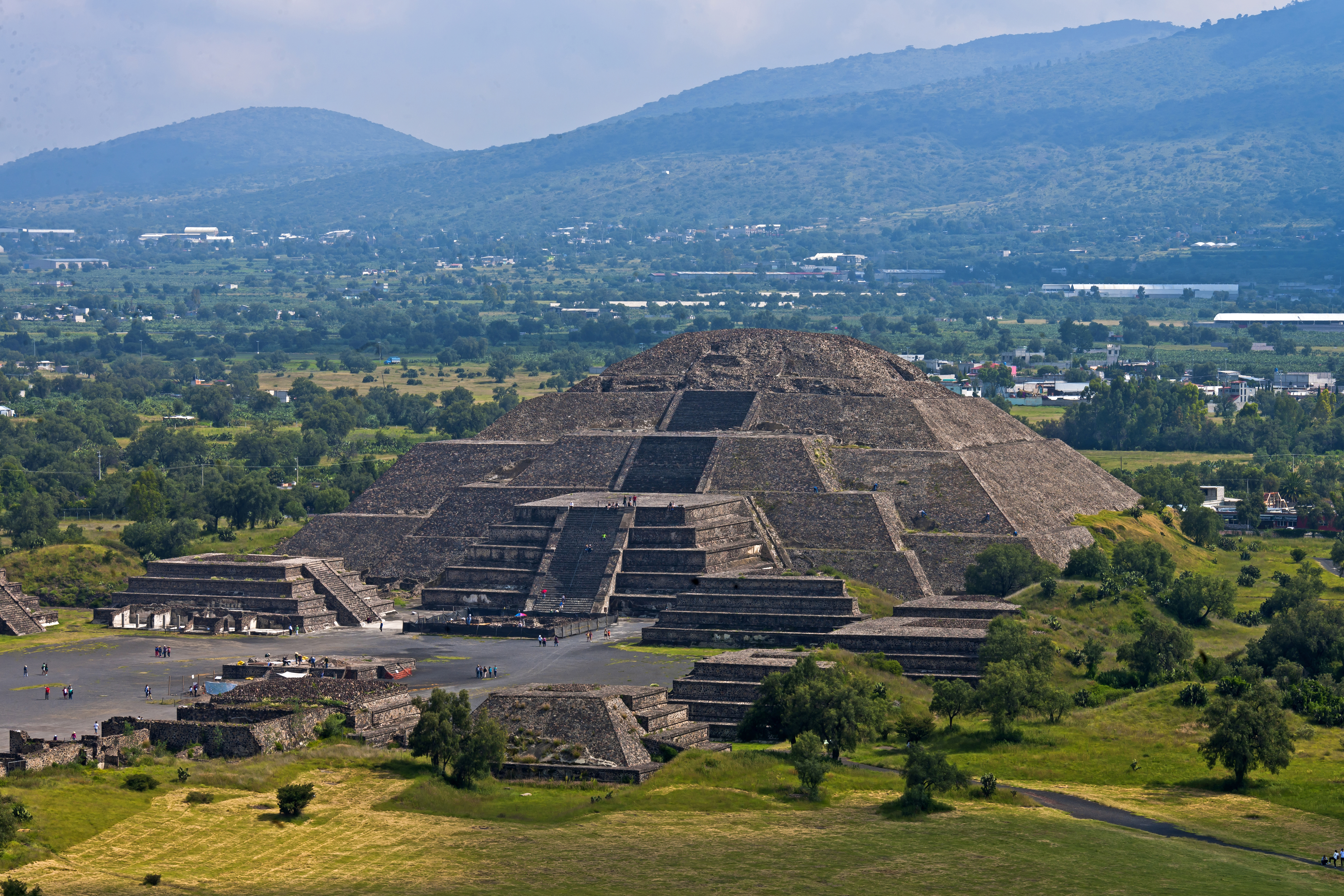
Pyramid of the Moon in Teotihuacan

Often the most important religious temples sat atop the towering pyramids, presumably as the closest place to the heavens. While recent discoveries point toward the extensive use of pyramids as tombs, the temples themselves seem to rarely, if ever, contain burials. Residing atop the pyramids, some of over two-hundred feet, such as that at El Mirador, the temples were impressive and decorated structures themselves. Commonly topped with a roof comb, or superficial grandiose wall, these temples might have served as a type of propaganda.

==== Pyramid of the Sun ====
The Pyramid of the Sun is the largest structure created in the city of Teotihuacan and one of the largest structures in the entire Western Hemisphere. It stands at about 216 feet and is roughly 720 by 760 ft (220 by 230 m) at its base. The pyramid is located on the east side of the avenue of the dead which runs almost directly down the center of the city of Teotihuacan. After archaeologists discovered animal remains, masks, figurines, specifically one of the Aztec god Huehueteotl, and shards of clay pots in the pyramid, it was agreed upon that the pyramid was likely a ritual temple at one point.

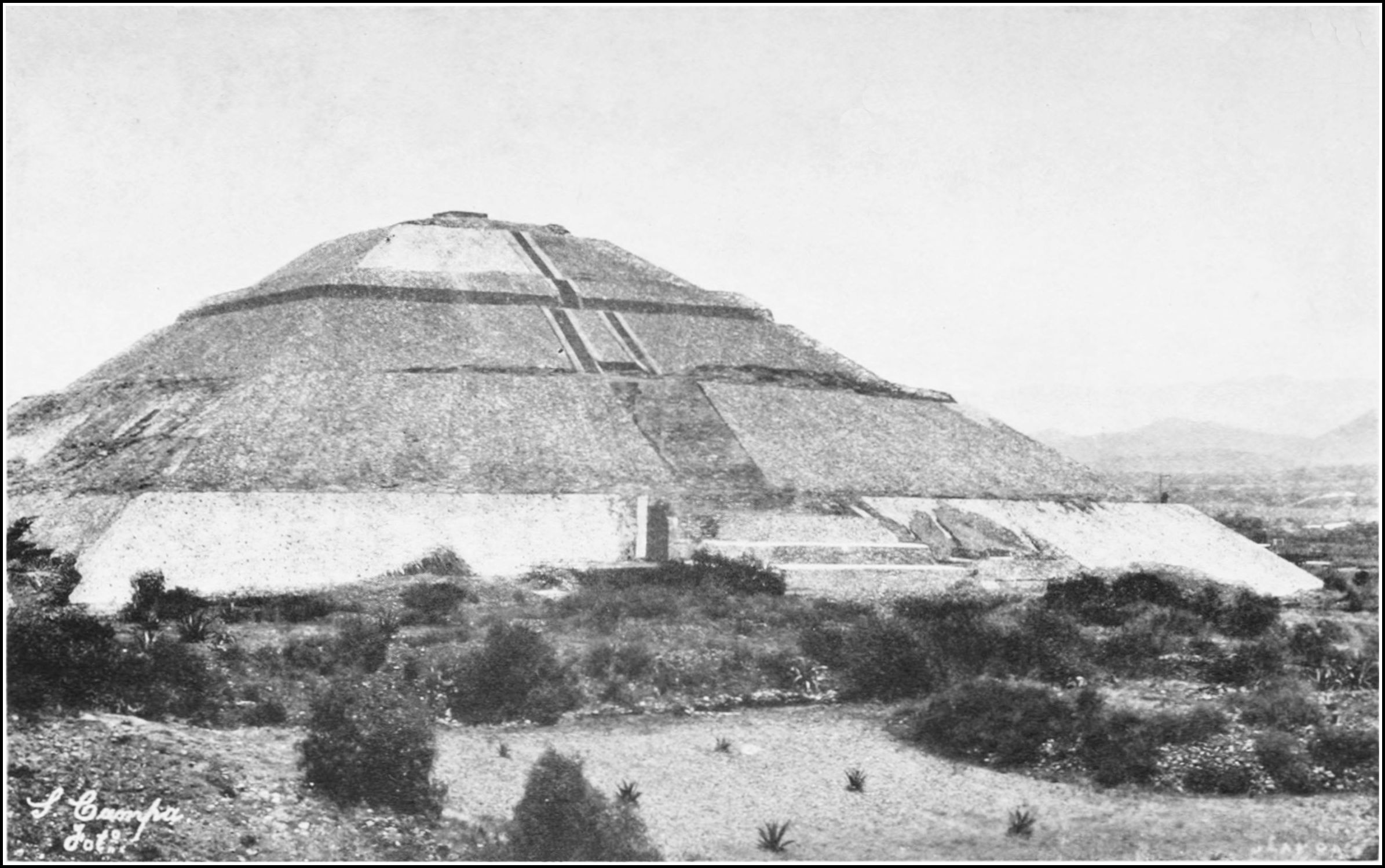
Pyramid of the Sun

=== Temple of the Feathered Serpent ===
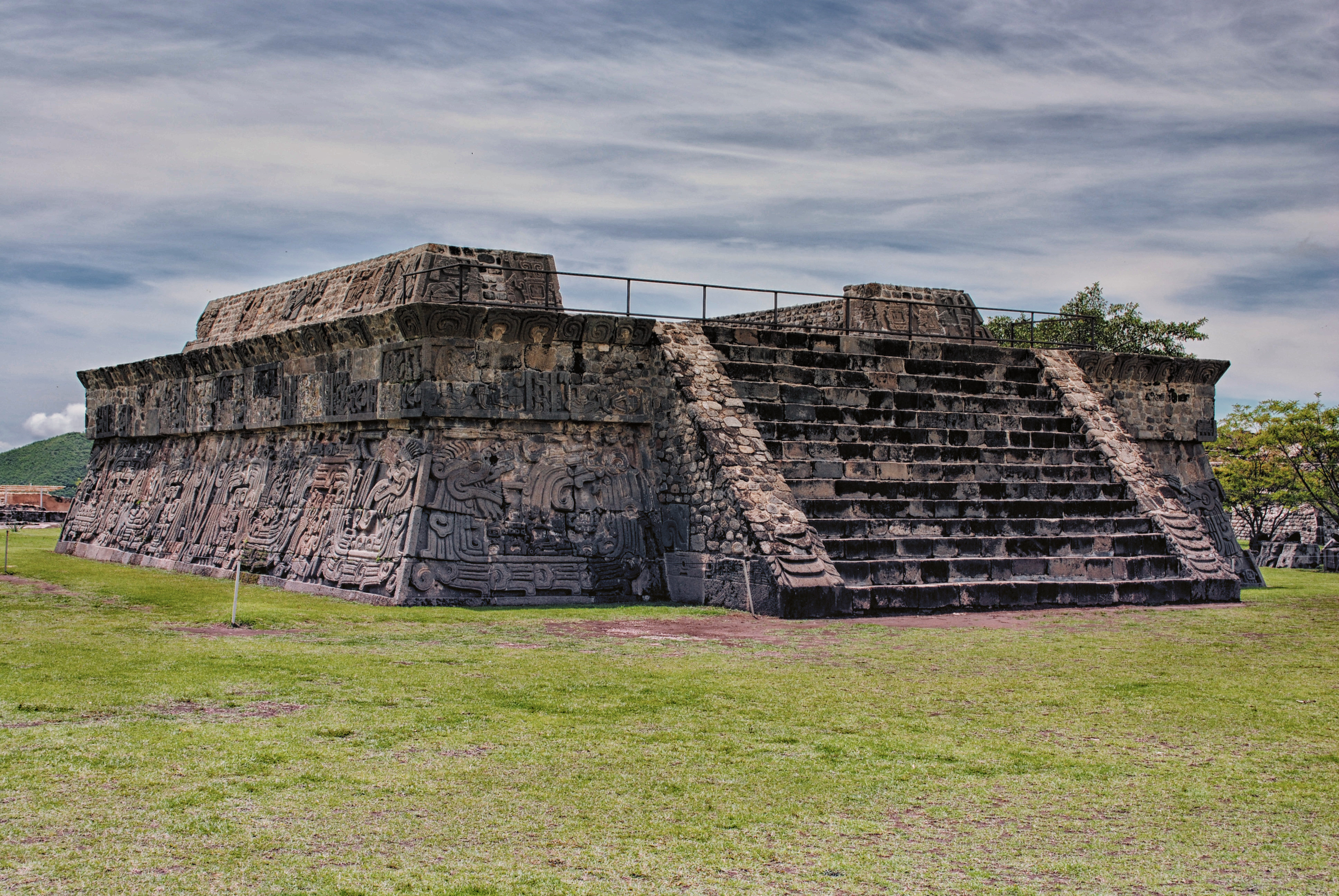
Temple of the Feathered Serpent

The Temple of the Feathered Serpent was constructed after the Pyramid of the Sun and the Pyramid of the Moon had been completed. The temple marks one of the first uses of the architecture style of talud-tablero. On the surfaces, the temple had murals illustrated on them just like so many temples that were built at the same time and by the same people. The tableros featured large serpent heads complete with elaborate headdresses. The feathered serpent refers to the Aztec god Quetzalcoatl.

=== Ballcourts ===
Layout chart of a typical Mesoamerican ball court.

The Mesoamerican ballgame ritual was a symbolic journey between the underworld and the world of the living, and many ball courts are found in the mid-part of the city functioning as a connection between the northern and southern halves of the city. All but the earliest ball courts are masonry structures. Over 1300 ball courts have been identified, and although there is a tremendous variation in size, they all have the same general shape: a long narrow alley flanked by two walls with horizontal, sloping, and sometimes vertical faces. The later vertical faces, such as those at Chichen Itza and El Tajin, are often covered with complex iconography and scenes of human sacrifice.

Although the alleys in early ball courts were open-ended, later ball courts had enclosed end-zones, giving the structure an -shape when viewed from above. The playing alley may be at ground level, or the ball court may be "sunken".

Ball courts were no mean feats of engineering. One of the sandstone stones on El Tajin's South Ball court is 11 m long and weighs more than 10 tons.

=== Residential quarters and elite residences ===
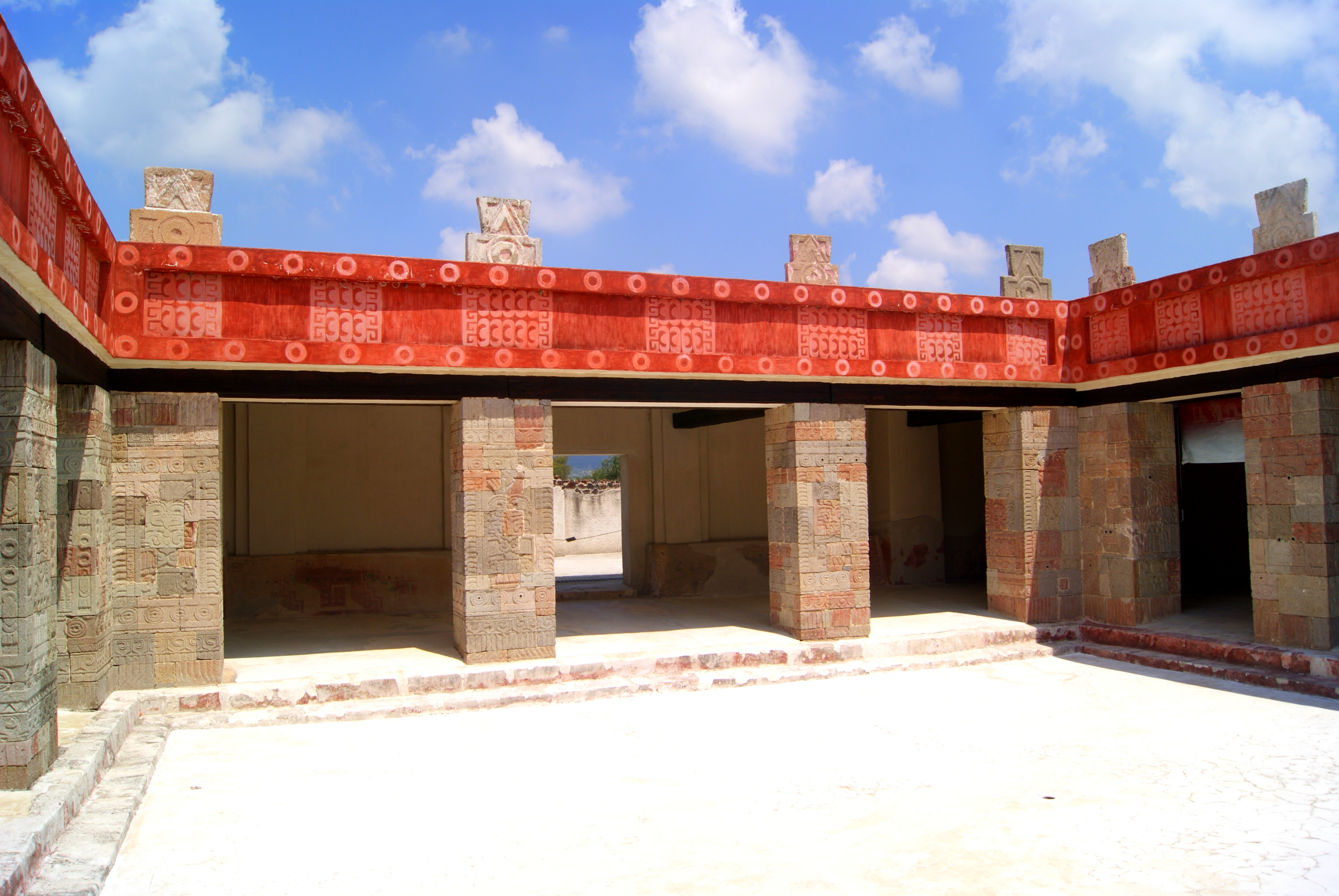
Courtyard in the Palace of Quetzalpapálotl

Large and often highly decorated, the palaces usually sat close to the center of a city and housed the population's elite. Any exceedingly large royal palace, or one consisting of many chambers on different levels might be referred to as an acropolis. However, often these were one-story and consisted of many small chambers and typically at least one interior courtyard; these structures appear to take into account the needed functionality required of a residence, as well as the decoration required for their inhabitants stature.

Archaeologists seem to agree that many palaces are home to various tombs. At Copán, beneath over four-hundred years of later remodeling, a tomb for one of the ancient rulers has been discovered and the North Acropolis at Tikal appears to have been the site of numerous burials during the Terminal Pre-classic and Early Classic periods.

=== Building materials ===
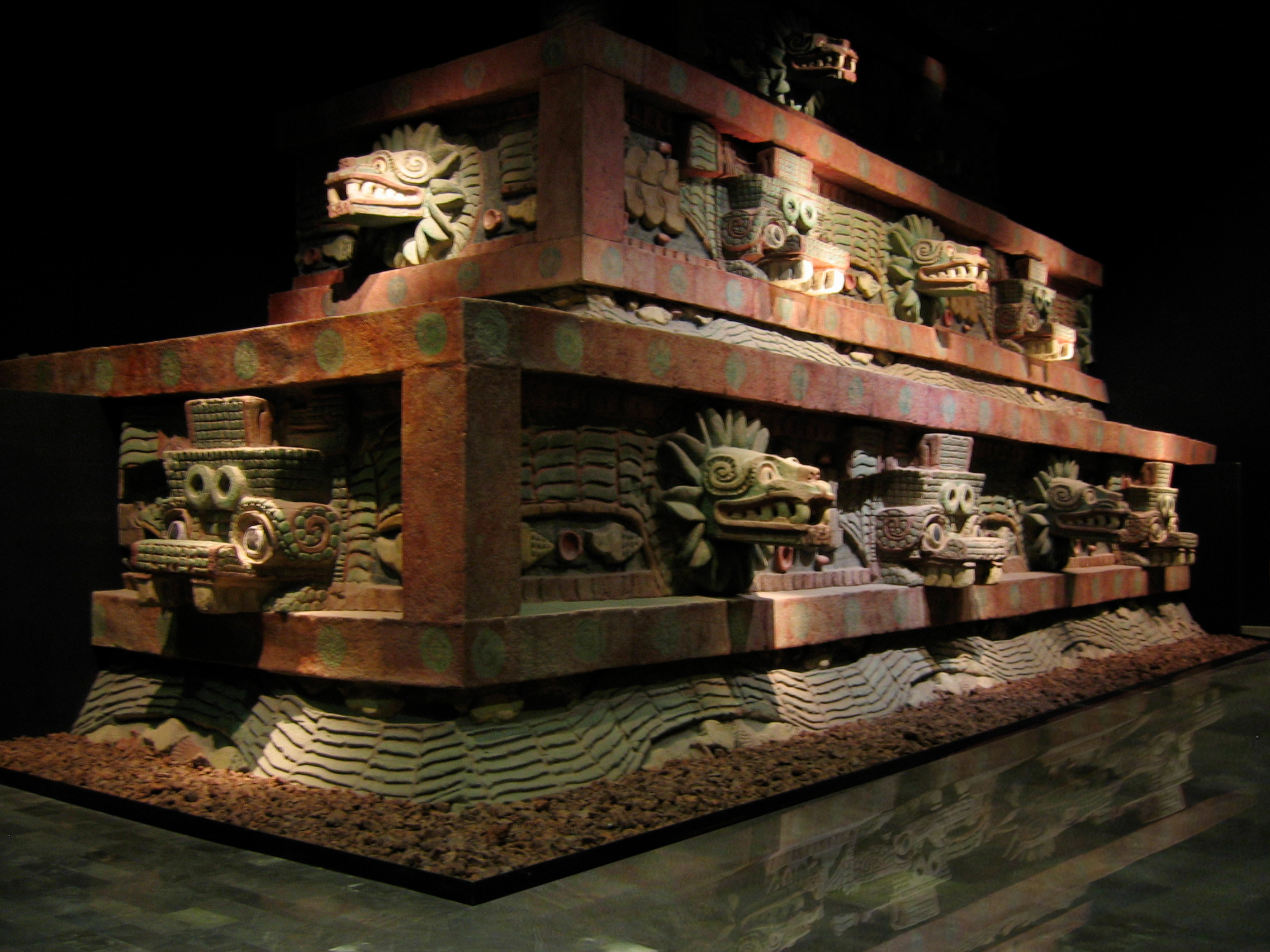
Teotihuacan style architecture displaying decorative ornamentation made of obsidian and shell inlaid into a painted cantera surface set upon a tezontle interior.

The most surprising aspect of the great Mesoamerican structures is their lack of many advanced technologies that would seem to be necessary for such constructions. Lacking metal tools, Mesoamerican architecture required one thing in abundance: manpower. Yet, beyond this enormous requirement, the remaining materials seem to have been readily available. They most often utilized limestone, which remained pliable enough to be worked with stone tools while being quarried, and only hardened once when removed from its bed. In addition to the structural use of limestone, much of their mortar consisted of crushed, burnt, and mixed limestone that mimicked the properties of cement and was used just as widely for stucco finishing as it was for mortar. However, later improvements in quarrying techniques reduced the necessity for this limestone-stucco as their stones began to fit quite perfectly, yet it remained a crucial element in some post and lintel roofs.

A common building material in central Mexico was tezontle (a light, volcanic rock). It was common for palaces and monumental structures to be made of this rough stone and then covered with stucco or with a cantera veneer. Very large and ornate architectural ornaments were fashioned from a very enduring stucco (kalk), especially in the Maya region, where a type of hydraulic limestone cement or concrete was also used. In the case of the common houses, wooden framing, adobe, and thatch were used to build homes over stone foundations. However, instances of what appear to be common houses of limestone have been discovered as well. Buildings were typically finished with high slanted roofs usually built of wood or thatch although stone roofs in these high slant fashions are also used rarely.

== Styles ==
=== Megalithic ===
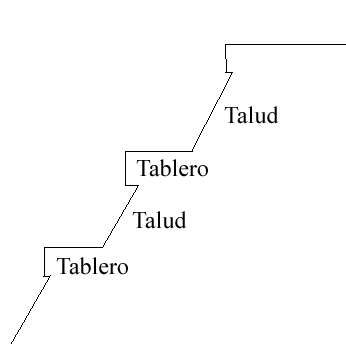
The talud-tablero style used in many Mesoamerican pyramids and a prominent stylistic feature of Teotihuacano architecture

An architectural construction technique that employs large dry-laid limestone blocks (c. 1 m × 50 cm × 30 cm) covered with a thick layer of stucco. This style was common in the northern Maya lowlands from the Preclassic until the early parts of the Early Classic.

=== Talud-tablero ===
Pyramids in Mesoamerican were platformed pyramids and many used a style called talud-tablero, which first became common in Teotihuacan. This style consists of a platform structure, or the "tablero," on top of a sloped "talud". Many different variants on the talud-tablero style arose throughout Mesoamerica, developing and manifesting itself differently among the various cultures.

=== Classic Period Maya styles ===
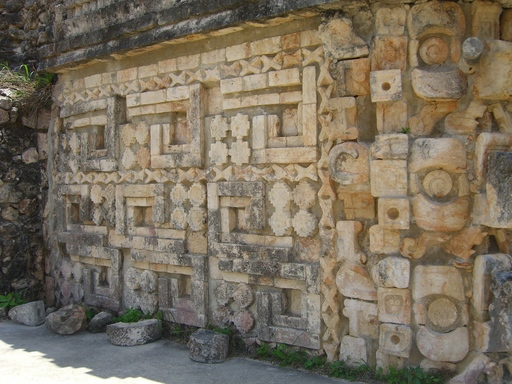
Puuc-style geometric design on a wall of the great temple of Uxmal.

Palenque, Tikal, Copán, Tonina, the corbeled arch.

=== "Toltec" Style ===
Chichén Itzá, Tula Hidalgo, chacmools, Atlantean figures, Quetzalcoatl designs.

=== Puuc ===
So named after the Puuc hills in which this style developed and flourished during the latter portion of the Late Classic and throughout the Terminal Classic in the northern Maya lowlands, Puuc architecture consists of veneer facing stones applied to a concrete core. Two façades were typically built, partitioned by a ridge of stone. The blank lower façade is formed by flat cut stones and punctuated by doorways. The upper partition is richly decorated with repeating geometric patterns and iconographic elements, especially the distinctive curved-nosed Chaac masks. Carved columnettes are also common.

== Technology ==
=== Corbelled arch ===
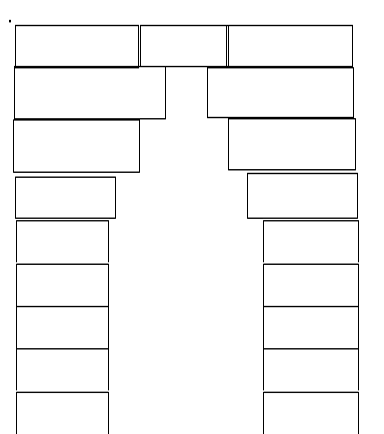
The principle of the "false" or corbelled arch is to build it without a keystone, but just with overlapping tiers of blocks

Mesoamerican cultures never invented the keystone, and so were unable to build true arches, but instead, all of their architecture made use of the "false" or Corbelled arch. These arches are built without centering and can be built without support, by corbelling regularly the horizontal courses of the wall masonry. This type of arch supports much less weight than a true arch.

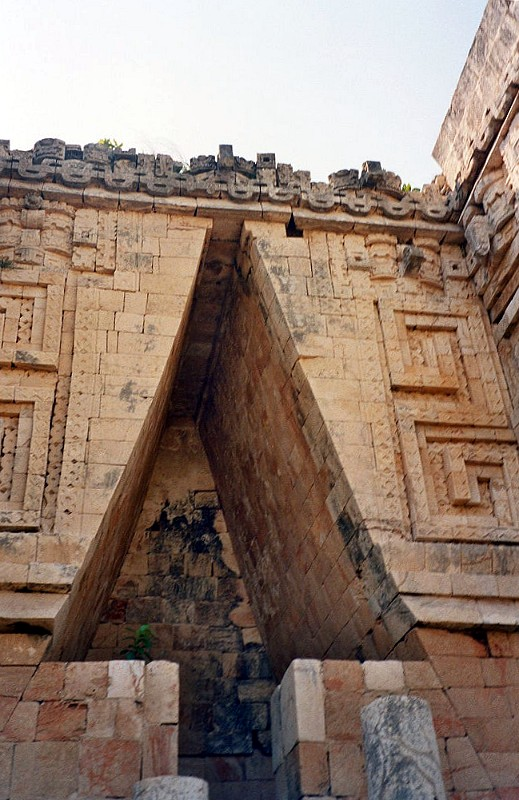
A fine example of a corbelled arch from the Maya site of Uxmal, Yucatán

However, recent work by engineer James O'Kon suggests the Mesoamerican "arch" is technically not a corbelled arch at all but a trapezium truss system. Moreover, unlike a corbelled arch, it does not rely on overlapping layers of blocks but cast-in-place concrete often supported by timber thrust beams. Computer analysis reveals this to be structurally superior to a curved arch

=== True arch ===
Scholars such as David Eccott and Gordon Ekholm argue that true arches were known in pre-Columbian times in Mesoamerica; they point to various examples of true arches at a Maya site in La Muneca, the facade of Temple A at Nukum, two low domes at Tajin in Veracruz, a sweat bath at Chichen Itza, and an arch at Oztuma. In 2010, a robot discovered a long arch-roofed passageway underneath the Pyramid of Quetzalcoatl, which stands in the ancient city of Teotihuacan north of Mexico City, dated to around 200 AD.

== UNESCO World Heritage Sites ==
A number of important archeological sites representing Mesoamerican architecture have been categorized as "World Heritage Sites" by the UNESCO.

El Salvador

- Maya site of Joya de Cerén

Honduras

- Maya Site of Copán

Guatemala

- Tikal National Park
- Archaeological Park and Ruins of Quirigua

Mexico

- Pre-Hispanic City and National Park of Palenque
- Pre-Hispanic Town of Uxmal
- Pre-Hispanic City of Teotihuacan
- Historic Centre of Oaxaca and Archaeological Site of Monte Albán
- Pre-Hispanic City of Chichen Itza
- Archaeological Monuments Zone of Xochicalco, Morelos
- El Tajin, Pre-Hispanic City of Veracruz
- Ancient Maya City of Calakmul, Campeche
- Historic Centre of Mexico City and Xochimilco (with templo mayor and adjacent temples)
- Agave Landscape and Ancient Industrial Facilities of Tequila (with guachimonotones and near teuchitlán culture sites)
- Prehistoric Caves of Yagul and Mitla in the Central Valley of Oaxaca (with the yagul archeological site)

== See also ==
- Maya architecture
- Mayan Revival architecture
- Maya city
- Buildings and structures in Mesoamerica
- Triadic pyramid
