= Quetzalpapálotl =

Ruins located in Teotihuacán, present-day Mexico

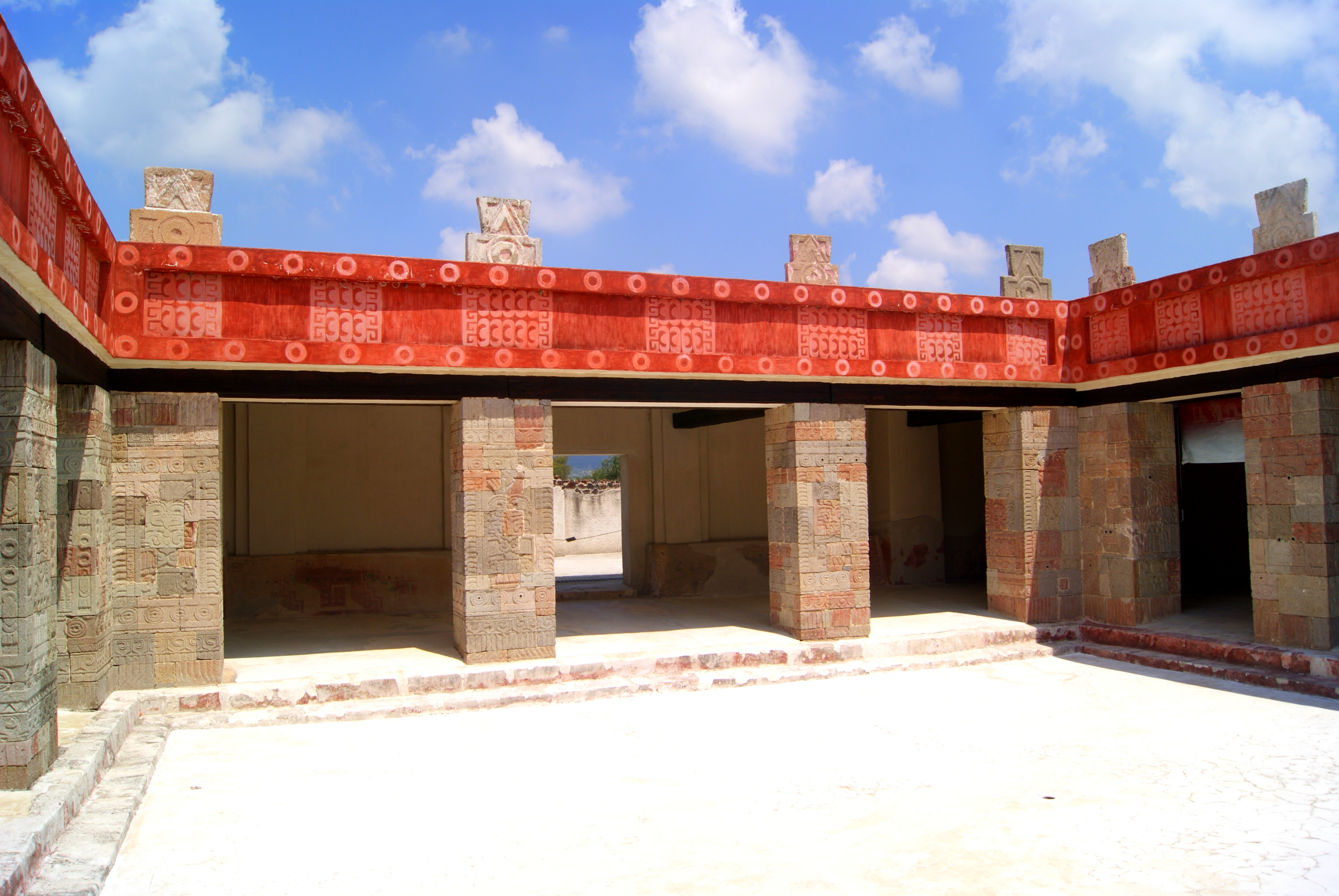
- Courtyard of the Palacio de Quetzalpapalotl

- Location within Mexico Location within State of Mexico

General information
- Type: Architectural complex
- Architectural style: Teotihuacán
- Location: Teotihuacán, State of Mexico, Mexico
- Coordinates: 19°41′52.14″N 98°50′43.79″W

Technical details
- Floor area: 4,500 m^{2}

The Quetzalpapálotl complex are ruins located in Teotihuacán. The complex is best known for the Palace of Quetzalpapálotl (Spanish: Palacio de Quetzalpapálotl) and the stone reliefs in its courtyard. Adjacent structures house surviving murals. The main entrance faces the Avenue of the Dead and is southwest of the Pyramid of the Moon.

== History ==
The existing structures were built around 450 to 500 AD. These buildings were built over earlier structures from around 250 to 300 AD. Due to the location of the palace and the quality of its art, it is thought the complex was home to a high ranking priest or other dignitary. The complex may have also been used for ceremonial purposes. The name Quetzalpapálotl comes from the reliefs of mythological birds on the courtyard pillars and is from Nahuatl quetzalli, precious feather, and pāpālōtl, butterfly.

The complex was rediscovered in 1962 by archaeologist Jorge Acosta. Between 2009 and 2011 the complex went through a rehabilitation by the Instituto Nacional de Antropología e Historia.

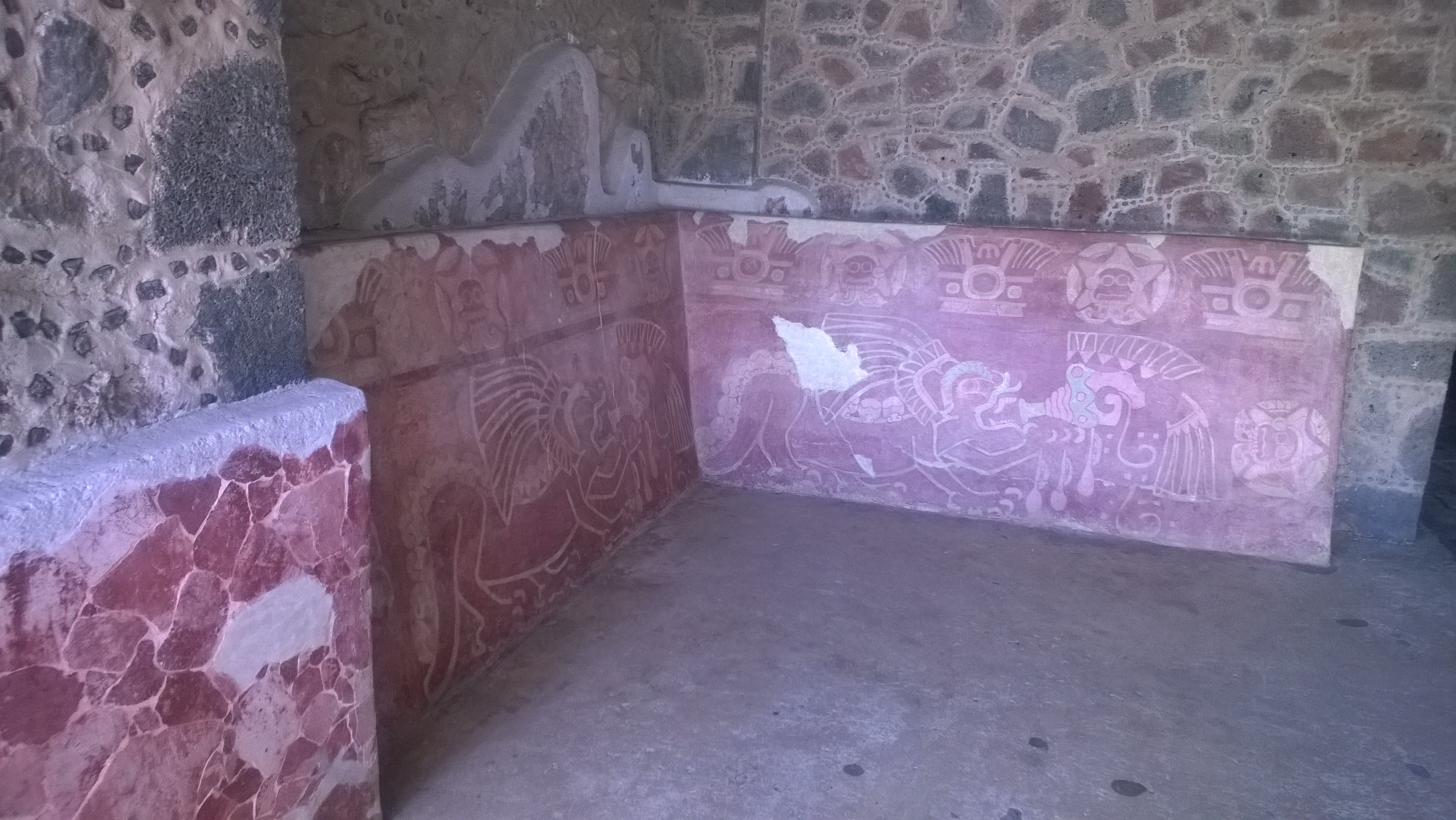
Remains of the murals in the Palace of the Jaguars

== Murals ==
In the Palace of the Jaguars there are murals depicting plumed felines holding conch shells and images of a goggled deity (this deity has been associated with the rain god Tlaloc of the much later Aztecs). On the subterranean Temple of the Feathered Conches, buried beneath the palace, there are depictions of a green bird and items associated with water and life.

== Gallery ==
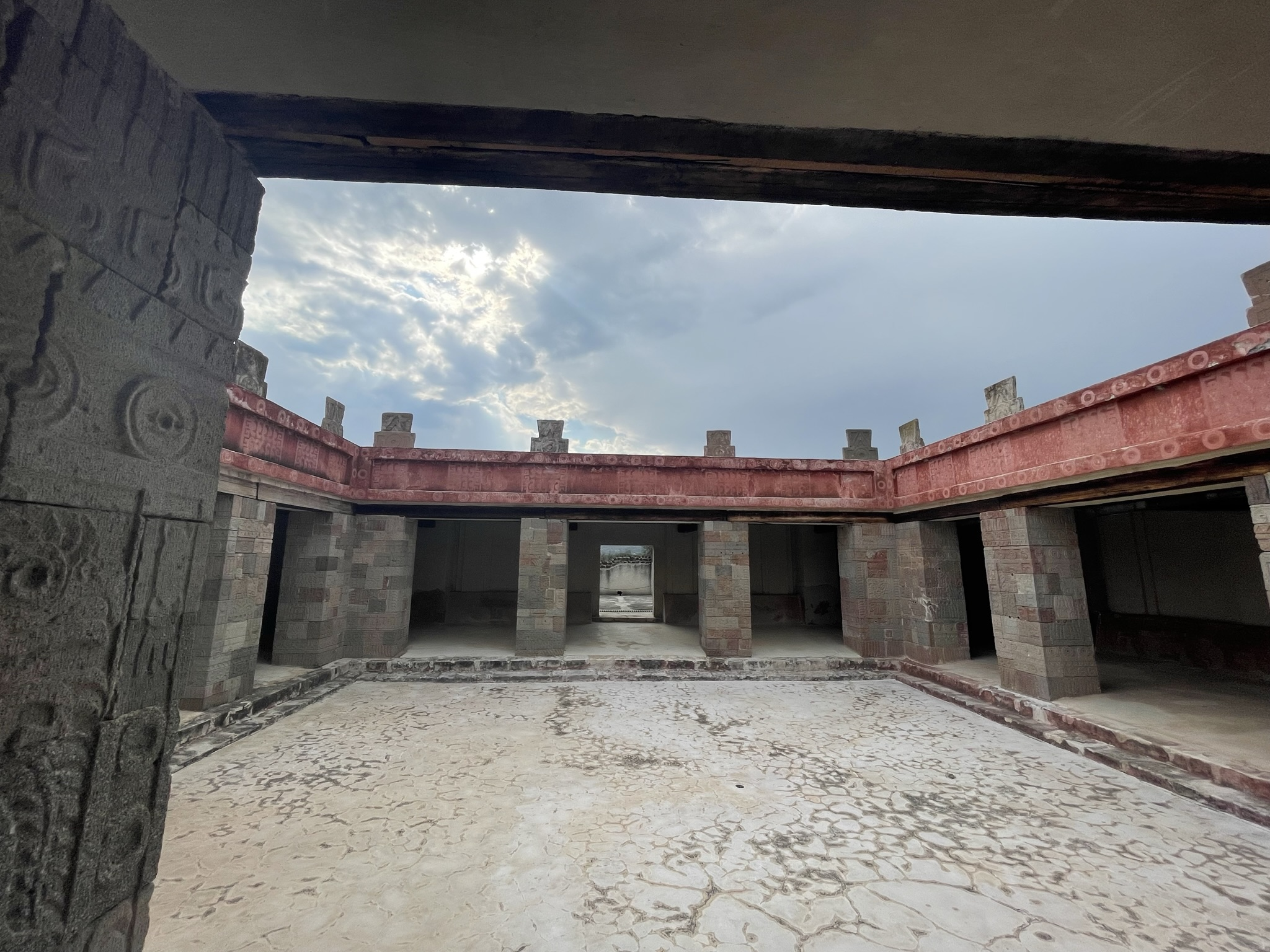

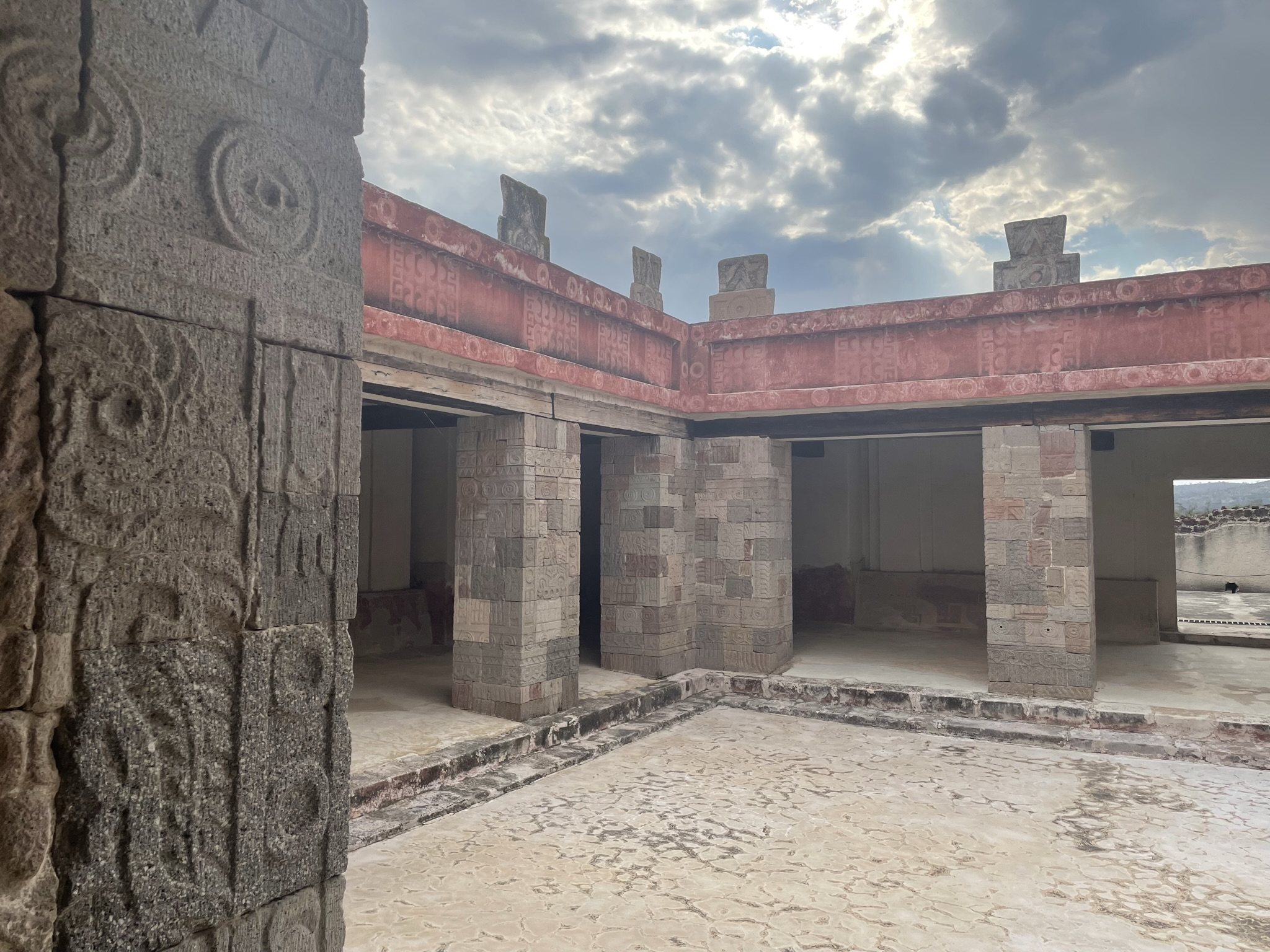

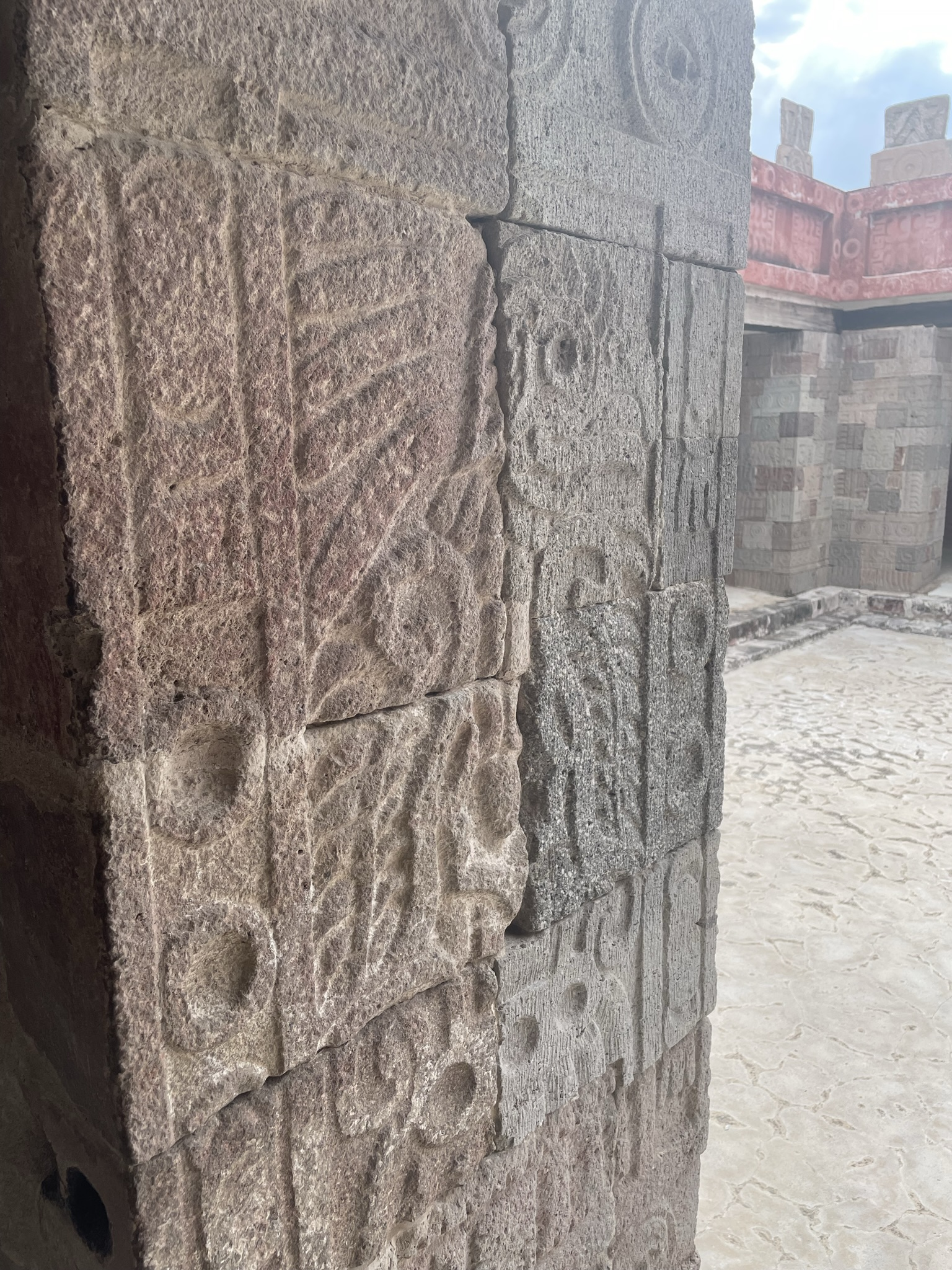

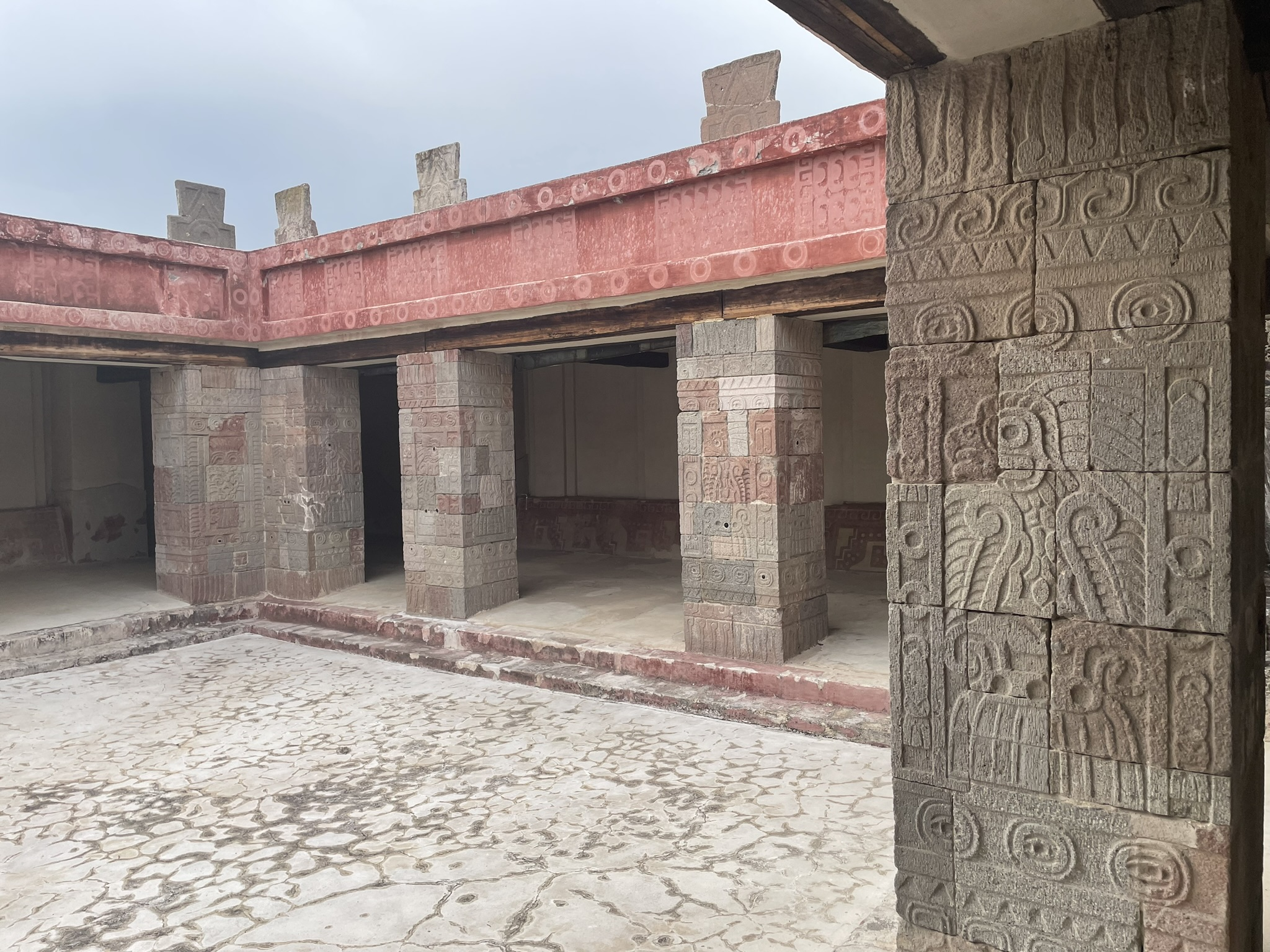

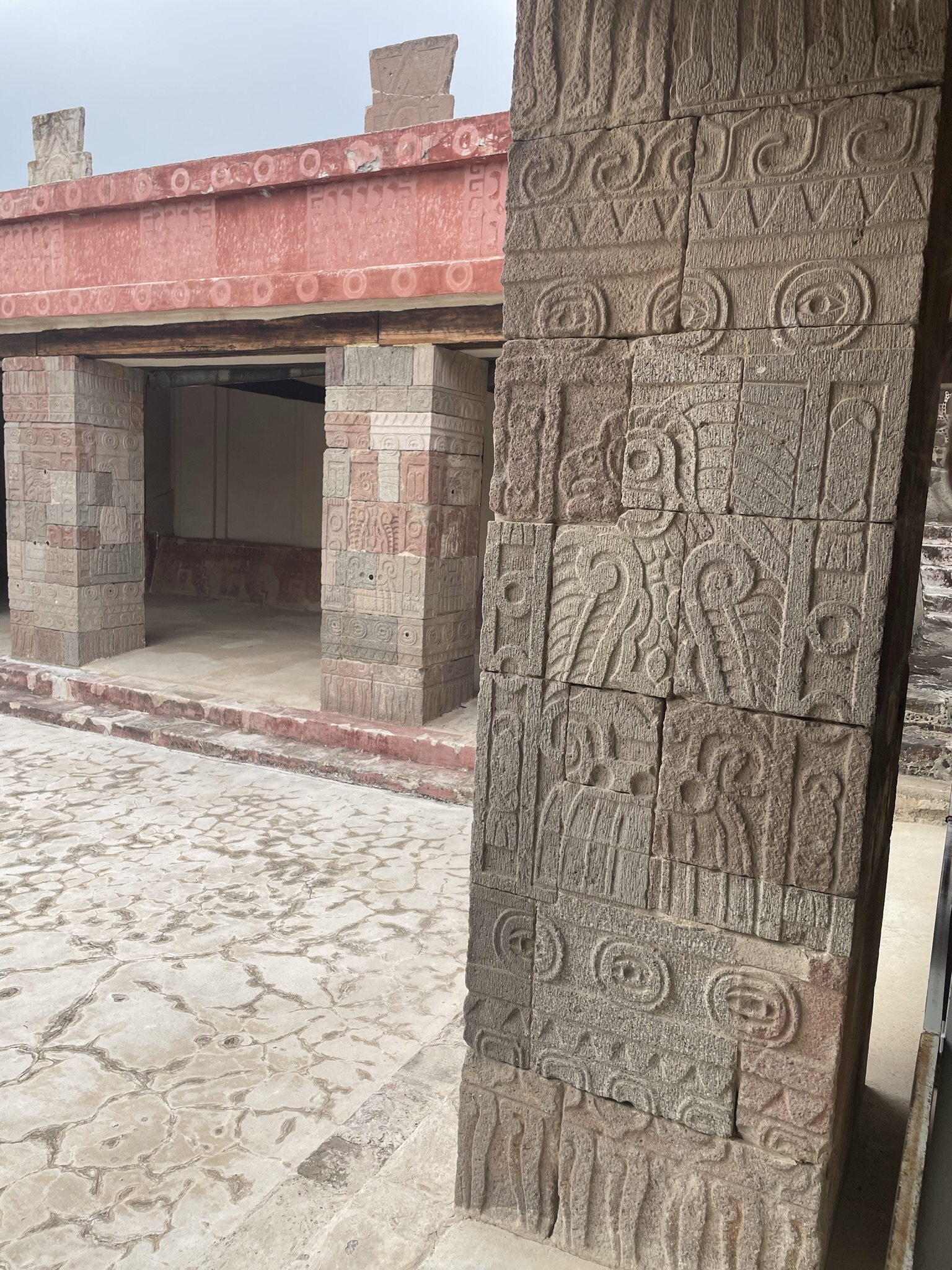

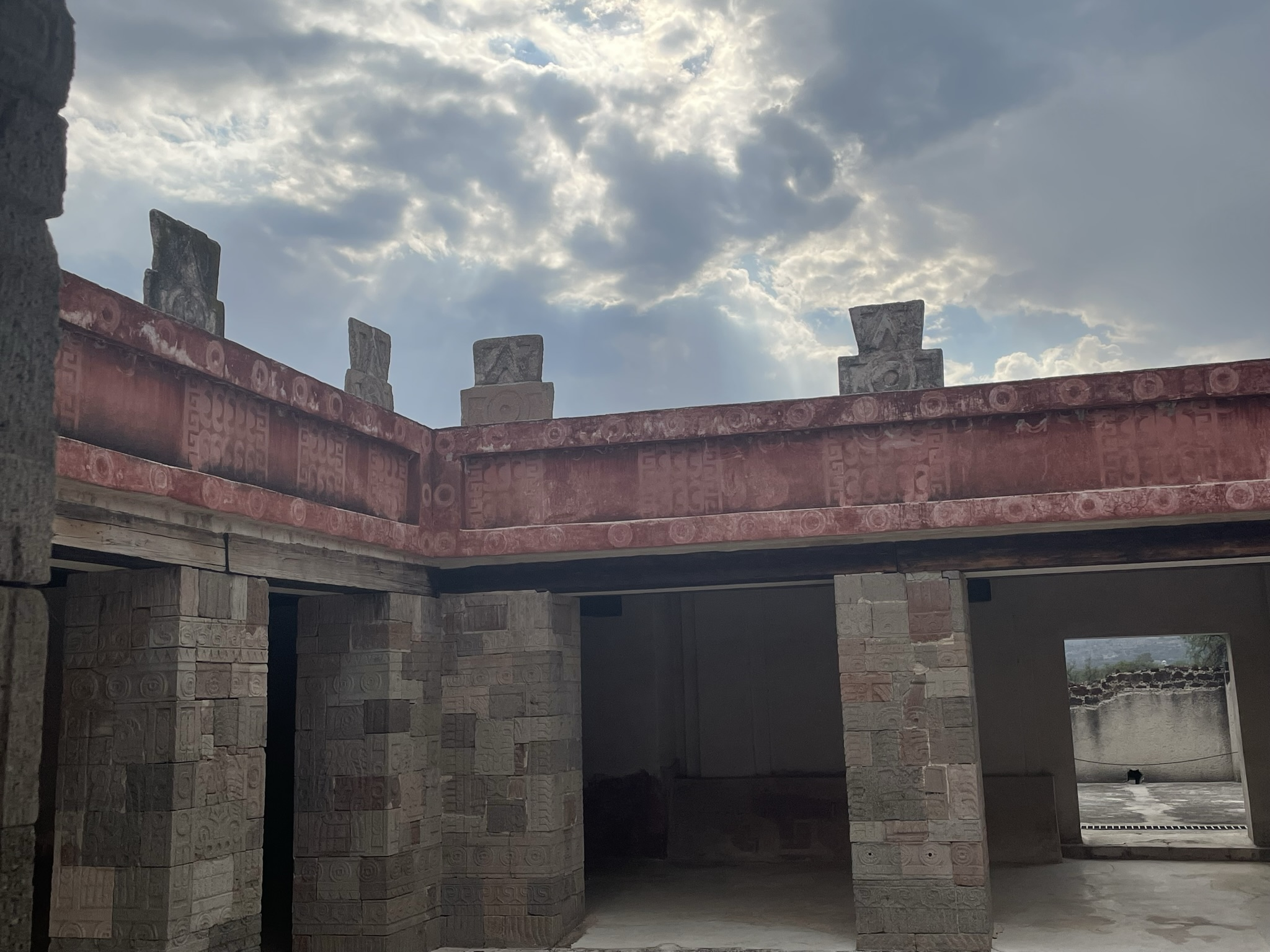

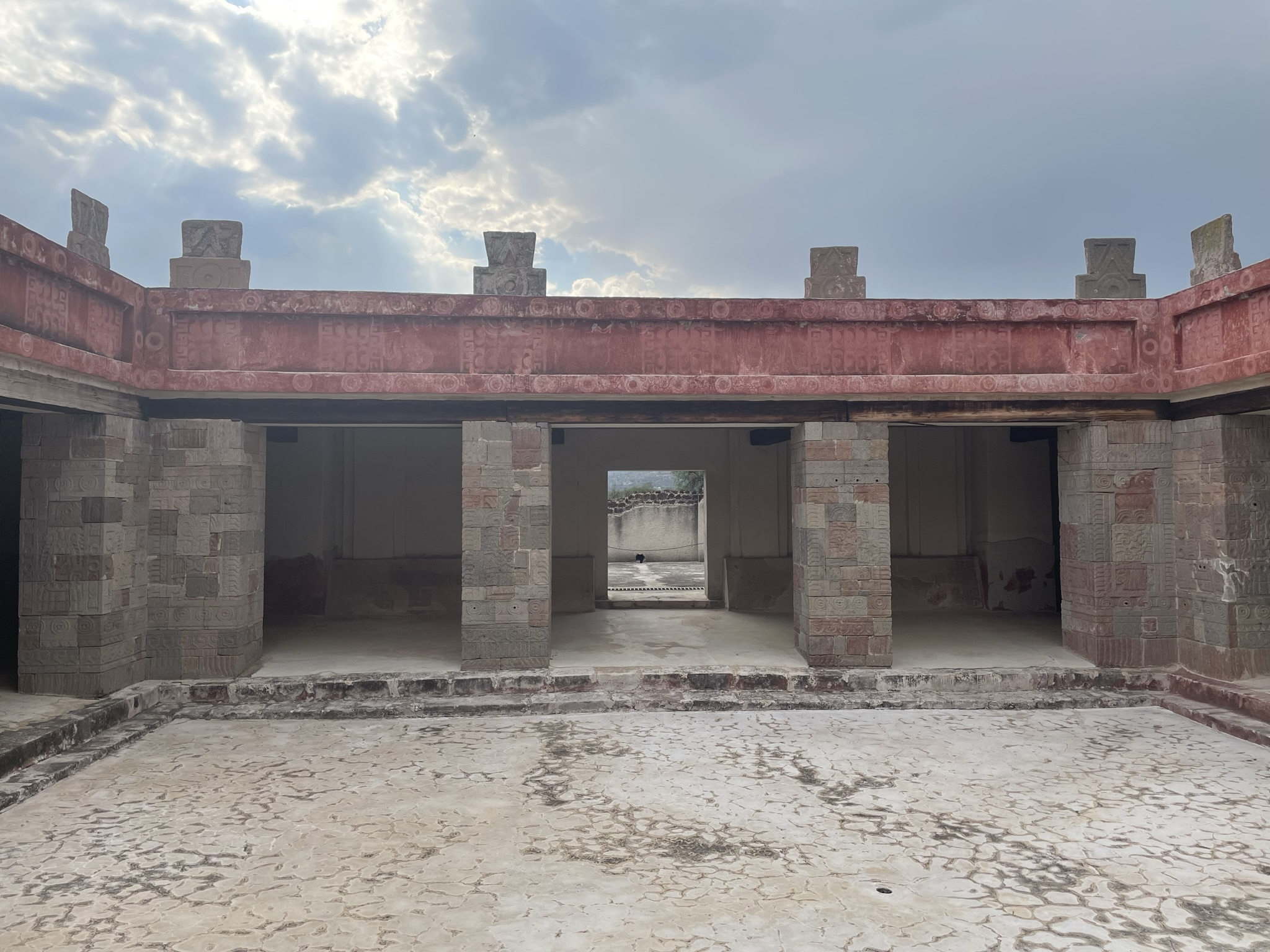
