= Teotihuacan Ocelot =

Alabaster sculpture found at Teotihuacan, Mexico

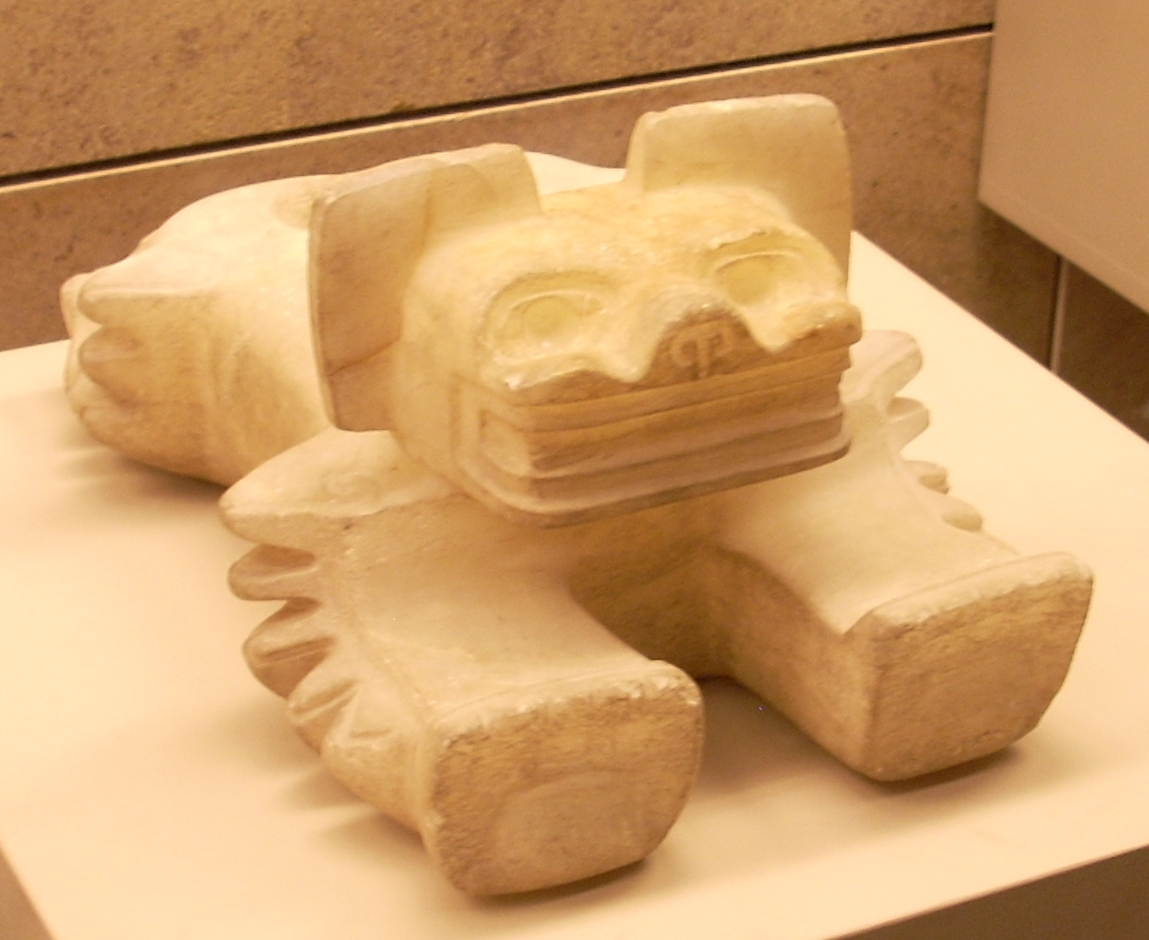
- Teotihuacan Ocelot on display in the British Museum
- Material: Calcite onyx
- Size: Height 16 cm, Length 33.5cm
- Created: 400-600 AD
- Discovered: Teotihuacan, Mexico
- Present location: British Museum, London
- Registration: Am1926-22

The Teotihuacan Ocelot or Teotihuacán Ocelot is the name of an alabaster sculpture of a feline found at the ancient Mesoamerican site of Teotihuacan, central Mexico. Discovered in the late nineteenth century, it was purchased by the British Museum in 1926.

== Description ==
This unique sculpture is an offering vessel in the form of a recumbent ocelot. Carved from a single piece of prestigious alabaster, the figure reflects the geometric style and pattern of contemporary funerary masks and architecture from Teotihuacan. The eyes would have once been inlaid with shells or precious stones and the depression on the feline's back would have held the temple offering - some have conjectured that this may have included human hearts removed for ritual sacrifices.

== Provenance ==
The feline figure was found by a labourer at the foot of the Pyramid of the Sun in Teotihuacan in 1889. It was initially offered to the Museo Nacional, but as they would not buy it, it was sold to an English traveller. The sculpture was eventually bought by the British Museum in 1926, with support from the Christy Fund. Only one other similar calcite statuette of a jaguar has been unearthed at the site, which is now in the Mexican national collection.

== Bibliography ==
- C. McEwan, Ancient Mexico in the British Museum (London, The British Museum Press, 1994)
- C. Berlo (ed.), Art, ideology and the city of Teotihuacan: A Symposium at Dumbarton Oaks, 8 and 9 October 1988 (Washington, D.C., Dumbarton Oaks Research Library and Collection, 1992)
- K. Berrin and E. Pasztory (eds.), Teotihuacan: Art from the city of the gods (Thames and Hudson, 1993)
- E. Pasztory, Teotihuacan: an experiment in living (Norman, University of Oklahoma Press, 1997)
