= Pyramid of the Sun =

Pyramid structure in Mexico

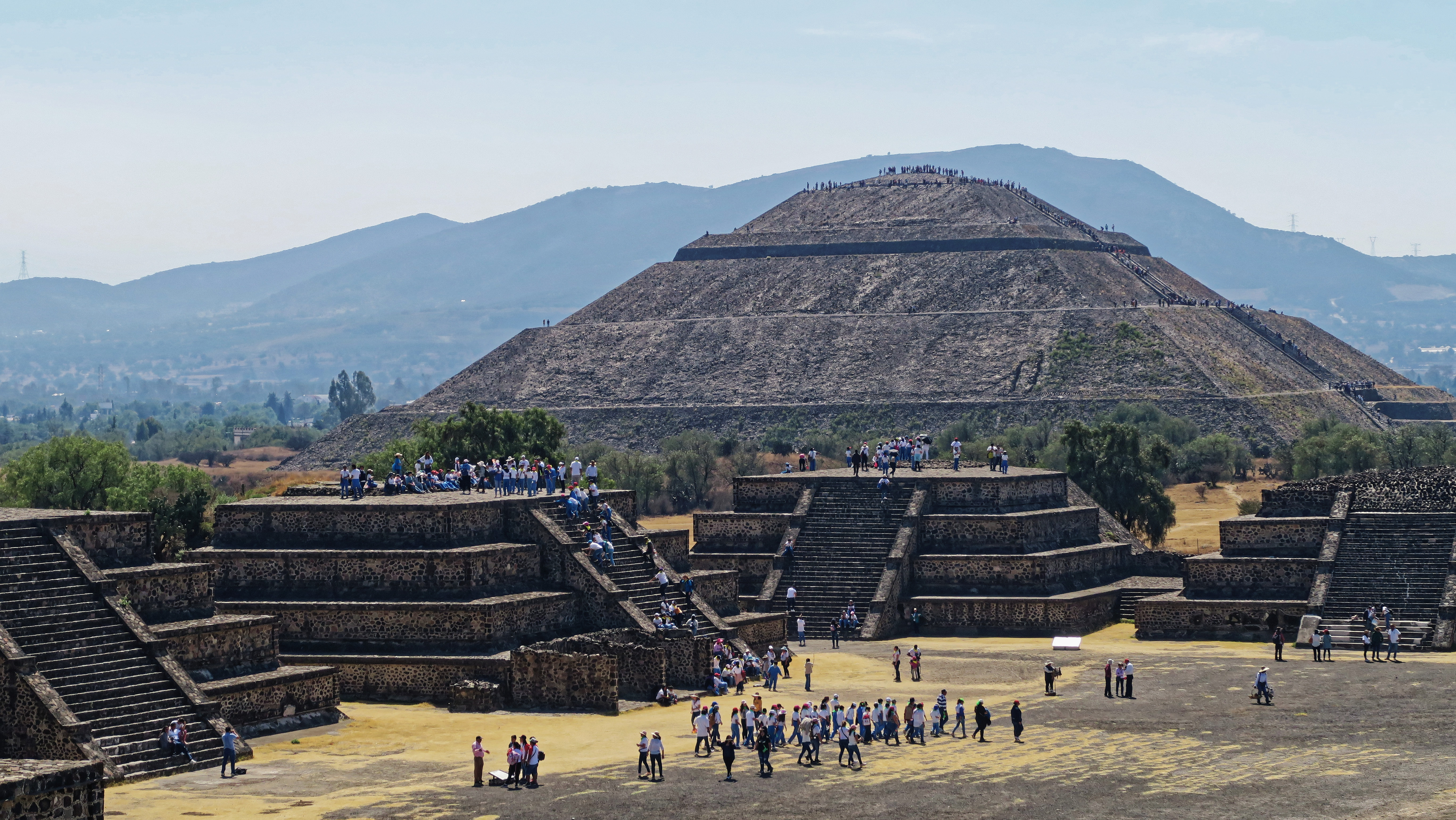
- View of the Sun Pyramid
- Interactive map of Pyramid of the Sun
- Type: Pyramid, Temple
- Periods: Mesoamerican classic
- Cultures: Toltec
- Location: Teotihuacán, Mexico State
- Region: Mesoamerica
- Part of: Teotihuacan

History
- Built: 200 AD
- Abandoned: 750 AD

Site notes
- Height: 65.5 meters (215 feet)
- Length: 220 meters (720 feet)
- Width: 230 m (750 ft)
- Volume: 1,184,828.3 cubic meters (41,841,820 ft^{3})
- Condition: Protected by UNESCO
- Owner: Cultural heritage
- Management: World Heritage Committee
- Public access: Yes
- Third largest ancient pyramid in the New World, the second largest is La Danta at El Mirador and the largest is the Great Pyramid of Cholula which is 90 kilometers away

The Pyramid of the Sun is the largest building in Teotihuacan, and one of the largest in Mesoamerica. It is believed to have been constructed about 200 AD. Found along the Avenue of the Dead, in between the Pyramid of the Moon and the Ciudadela, and in the shadow of the mountain Cerro Gordo, the pyramid is part of a large complex in the heart of the city.

== History ==
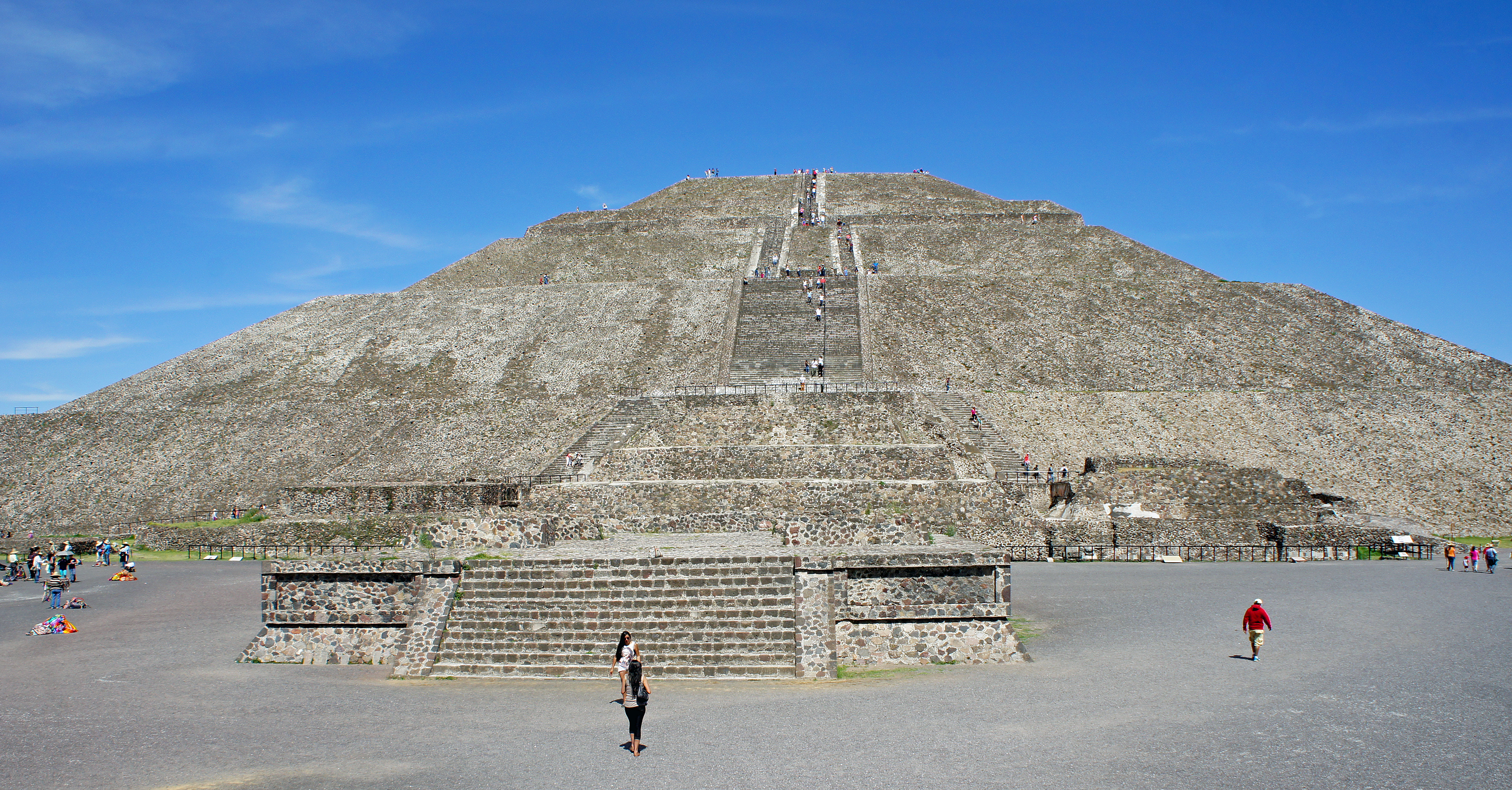
Front view

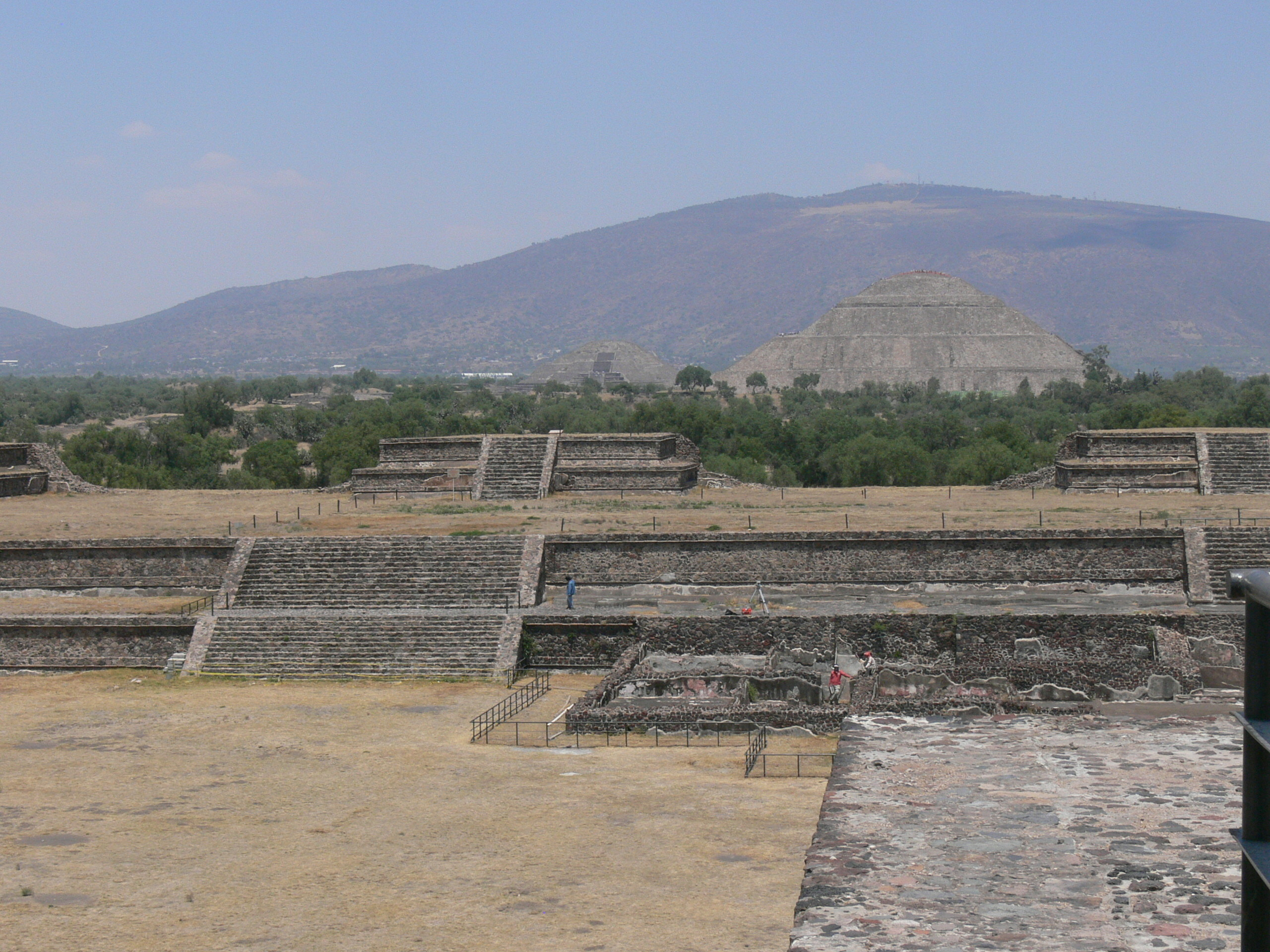
Pyramid of the Sun in Teotihuacan

The name Pyramid of the Sun comes from the Aztecs, who visited the city of Teotihuacan centuries after it was abandoned; the name given to the pyramid by the Teotihuacanos is unknown. It was constructed in two phases. The first construction stage, around 200 AD, brought the pyramid to nearly the size it is today. The second round of construction resulted in its completed size of 225 meters (738 feet) across and 75 meters (246 feet) high, making it one of the largest pyramids in the world, though still just over half the height of the Great Pyramid of Giza (146 metres). The second phase also saw the construction of an altar atop the pyramid which has not survived into modern times.

Over the structure, the ancient Teotihuacanos finished their pyramid with lime plaster imported from surrounding areas, on which they painted brilliantly colored murals. While the pyramid has endured for centuries, the paint and plaster have not and are no longer visible. Jaguar heads and paws, stars, and snake rattles are among the few images associated with the pyramids.

It is thought that the pyramid venerated a deity within Teotihuacan society. However, little evidence exists to support this hypothesis. The destruction of the temple on top of the pyramid, by both deliberate and natural forces prior to the archaeological study of the site, has so far prevented identification of the pyramid with any particular deity.

== Structure measurements, location and orientation ==
Dimension	Value
Height	71.17 metres or 233.5 feet
Base perimeter	794.79 metres or 2,607.6 feet
Side	230 metres or 750 feet
1/2 side	111.74 metres or 366.6 feet
Angle of slope	32.494 degrees
Lateral surface area	59,213.68 square metres or 637,370.7 square feet (assumes perfect square base and smooth faces)
Volume	1,184,828.31 cubic metres or 41,841,817 cubic feet (assumes perfect square base and smooth faces)

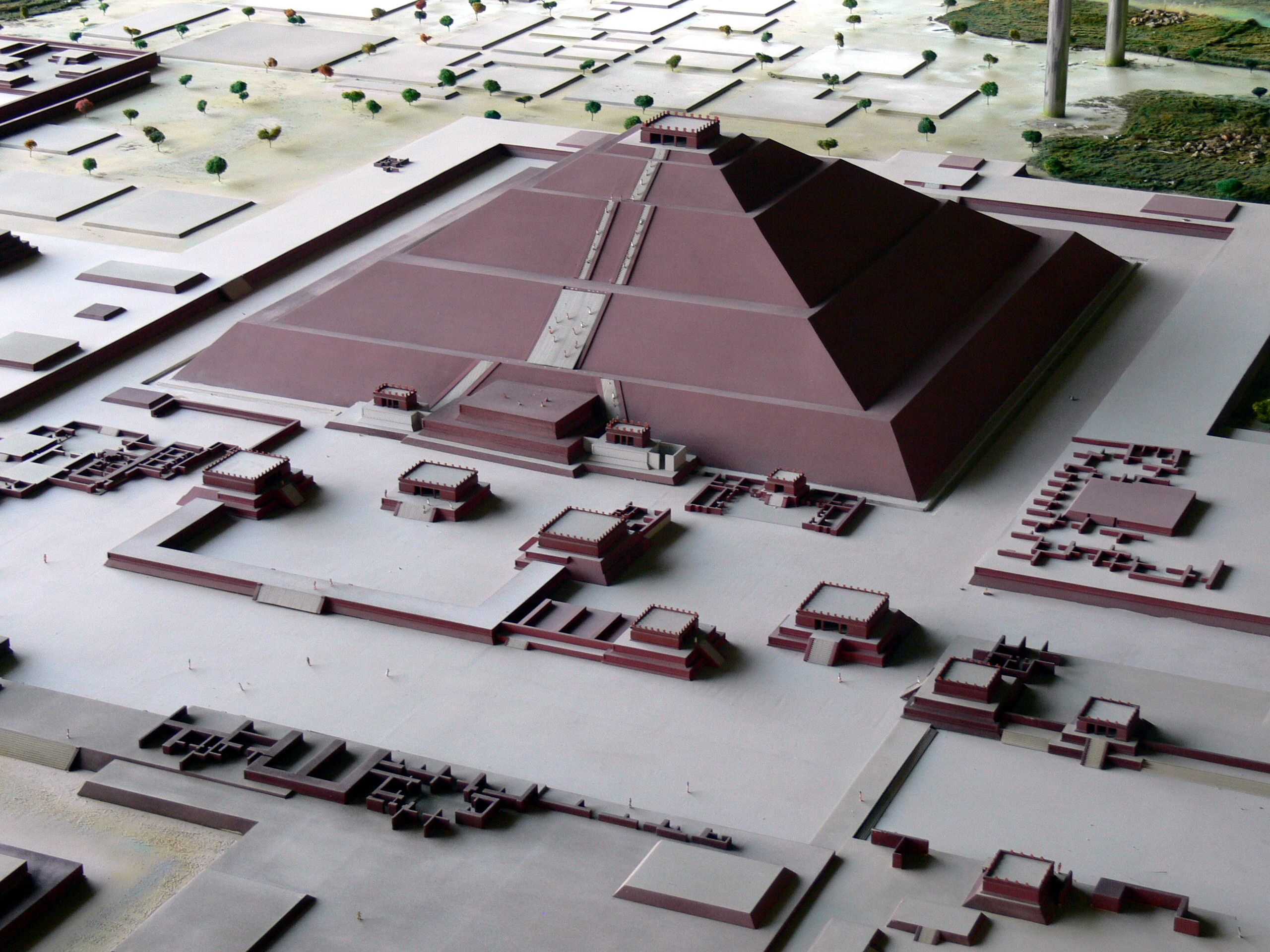
A model of the pyramid

The pyramid was built on a carefully selected spot, from where it was possible to align it both to the prominent Cerro Gordo to the north and, in perpendicular directions, to sunrises and sunsets on specific dates, recorded by a number of architectural orientations in Mesoamerica. The whole central part of the urban grid of Teotihuacan, including the Avenue of the Dead, reproduces the orientation of the Sun Pyramid, while the southern part exhibits a slightly different orientation, dictated by the Ciudadela.

== Excavations underneath the Pyramid ==
The caves and tunnel systems underneath the pyramid have been investigated by various archaeologists who have all concluded that these caves were sacred to those in Teotihuacan in the same way that caves were important cross-culturally in Mesoamerica. Different ethnic groups were said to have emerged from caves and cavities, known as the "wombs of the Earth"; many glyphs using the symbol for caves have been discovered by archaeologists; and they were used as sites for offerings and sacrifices to the various gods and deities associated with caves, such as the earth deity Tepeyolotl and the cave-dwelling fire deity Xiuhtecuhtli. For example, in the Etzalcualiztli fiesta, a holiday celebrating Tláloc, the god of rain, sacrifices and offerings were placed in a cave. Various sources have different theories for why the Pyramid of the Sun was built and what the cave systems underneath it truly mean according to the Teotihuacan people and culture.

In 1959, archaeologist Rene Millon and his team of researchers were some of the first archaeologists to study the tunnel system underneath the Pyramid of the Sun. While some of these tunnels were made after the fall of Teotihuacan and the Aztecs, they eventually connected to tunnels and caves that were made during the periods of these civilizations. The investigations led by Millon revealed that most of the main tunnels were sealed off, although whether this was purposeful or not is up to interpretation. The tunnels provided pieces of pottery, hearths, and other meticulously made artifacts from other cultures also evidenced elsewhere in Teotihuacan. Million and his team ultimately concluded that, due to the influence of different cultures on the artifacts found in the tunnels, either the pyramid was built continuously over various periods of time by the people in Teotihuacan, or that the foundation and cave system were made in one period and the pyramid was built on top in a later period. Million and his team believe that earlier theories that the pyramids in Teotihuacan were built by slaves are incorrect; the craftsmanship of the pyramid, as well as the popularity of Teotihuacan amongst its peoples, suggests the people who built the pyramids had the motivation to do so, whether they immigrated from elsewhere in Mesoamerica or not.

In 1971, archaeologist Ernesto Taboada discovered an entrance to a seven-meter-deep pit at the foot of the main staircase of the Pyramid of the Sun. This cave directly underneath the pyramid is located six metres beneath the center of the structure, and was originally believed to be a naturally formed lava tube and possibly the mythical site of Chicomoztoc, the place of human origin according to Nahua legends. More recent excavations suggest the space is man-made and could have served as a royal tomb. For example, archeologist Doris Heyden says:

Since skeletal remains and charcoal are absent in the cave, owing to ancient vandalism, it is impossible to date the earliest use of the place for ritual purposes or for rites of passage. The ceramics and discs could have been placed here centuries after the conversion of the natural tunnel into a shrine. In view of the position of the pyramid over the grotto, it would seem that the cave was the focal point and not an accidental coincidence, and that it may have determined the site for the construction of a primitive place of worship and then for the pyramid.

The cave was likely built early in Teotihuacan's history as a shrine that was later covered with the Pyramid of the Sun. The site of the shrine served as a ceremonial place for the Aztec people as it held significant religious history for the city of Teotihuacan, and was a focal point for society as it was located on the Street of the Dead. The city layout of Teotihuacan incorporated alignments dictated by the astronomically significant orientation of the Pyramid of the Sun: the peak of the pyramid aligned with the horizon in order to serve as a natural marker of the sun's position on the Aztec quarter days of the year. Thus, this cave is more important than most in Aztec culture and religion. Recently, scientists have used muon detectors to try to find other chambers within the interior of the pyramid.

== Recovered artifacts ==
Comparison of approximate profiles of the Pyramid of the Sun with some notable pyramidal or near-pyramidal buildings. Dotted lines indicate original heights, where data is available. In its SVG file, hover over a pyramid to highlight and click for its article.

Only a few caches of artifacts have been found in and around the pyramid. Obsidian arrowheads and human figurines have been discovered inside the pyramid and similar objects have been found at the nearby Pyramid of the Moon and Pyramid of the Feathered Serpent in the Ciudadela. These objects may have represented sacrificial victims. A unique historical artifact discovered near the foot of the pyramid at the end of the nineteenth century was the Teotihuacan Ocelot, which is now in the British Museum's collection. In addition, burial sites of children have been found in excavations at the corners of the pyramid. It is believed that these burials were part of a sacrificial ritual dedicating the building of the pyramid.

== See also ==
- List of Mesoamerican pyramids
- List of tallest structures built before the 20th century
