= List of World Heritage Sites in Syria =

Location of World Heritage Sites in Syria

The United Nations Educational, Scientific and Cultural Organization (UNESCO) designates World Heritage Sites of outstanding universal value to cultural or natural heritage which have been nominated by countries which are signatories to the UNESCO World Heritage Convention, established in 1972. Cultural heritage consists of monuments (such as architectural works, monumental sculptures, or inscriptions), groups of buildings, and sites (including archaeological sites). Natural heritage consists of natural features (physical and biological formations), geological and physiographical formations (including habitats of threatened species of animals and plants), and natural sites which are important from the point of view of science, conservation, or natural beauty. The Syrian Arab Republic, then under Ba'athist rule, accepted the convention on 13 August 1975, making its historical sites eligible for inclusion on the list. As of 2016, six sites in Syria are included.

The first site in Syria, Ancient City of Damascus, was inscribed on the list at the 3rd Session of the World Heritage Committee, held in Paris, France in 1979. Ancient City of Bosra and Site of Palmyra were inscribed the following year as the second and the third site, while Ancient City of Aleppo was added in 1986. Crac des Chevaliers and Qal'at Salah El-Din were added collectively to the list in 2006, followed by Ancient Villages of Northern Syria in 2011. All six of Syria's properties have been placed on UNESCO's List of World Heritage in Danger since 2013, as their integrity has been to varied degrees compromised following the outbreak of the Syrian Civil War; Aleppo in particular has suffered extensive damage, while a number of prominent structures in Palmyra have been destroyed. Syria served on the World Heritage Committee once, from 1989 to 1995.

== World Heritage Sites ==
UNESCO lists sites under ten criteria; each entry must meet at least one of the criteria. Criteria i through vi are cultural, and vii through x are natural.

† In danger

World Heritage Sites
Site	Image	Location (governorate)	Year listed	UNESCO data	Description
Ancient City of Aleppo^{†}		Aleppo	1986	21; iii, iv (cultural)	Situated at the crossroads of several trade routes, Aleppo has been successively ruled, among others, by the Hittites, Assyrians, Akkadians, Greeks, Romans, Umayyads, Ayyubids, Mamluks and Ottomans, each leaving significant influence in its architectural fabric, resulting in a diverse cityscape. Major structures include the Citadel, the Great Umayyad Mosque and the Madrasa Halawiye.
Ancient City of Bosra^{†}		Daraa	1980	22bis; i, iii, vi (cultural)	Formerly a Nabataean settlement, Bosra was conquered by the Romans in the 2nd century CE and made capital of Arabia. It came under Islamic rule in the 7th century. Remains of the ancient city include a theatre, a basilica, a cathedral, a mosque and a madrasa, among others.
Ancient City of Damascus^{†}		Damascus	1979	20bis; i, ii, iii, iv, vi (cultural)	Established the 3rd millennium BCE, Damascus is considered to be one of the oldest continuously inhabited cities in the world. As the capital of the Umayyads, it has been of significant influence to the Arab world. The Great Mosque is among the largest in the world and the oldest sites of continuous prayer since the beginnings of Islam.
Ancient Villages of Northern Syria^{†}		several sites	2011	1348; iii, iv, v (cultural)	The site comprises some 40 villages, dating from the 1st to 7th centuries and abandoned in the 8th to 10th centuries. They provide an insight into rural life in Late Antiquity and during the Byzantine period.
Crac des Chevaliers and Qal'at Salah El-Din^{†}		Homs, Latakia	2006	1229; ii, iv (cultural)	The Crac des Chevaliers and the Qal'at Salah El-Din are regarded as two of the most prominent examples of castles during the Crusader period, demonstrating an evolution of fortifications and exchange of influences in defensive technology.
Site of Palmyra^{†}		Homs	1980	23bis; i, ii, iv (cultural)	Palmyra came under Roman rule in the 1st century CE, and grew to become one of the most important cultural centres of the ancient world. Its extensive ruins include remains of the Great Colonnade, the Temple of Bel, the Camp of Diocletian and the Roman Theatre.

== Tentative list ==
In addition to sites inscribed on the World Heritage List, member states can maintain a list of tentative sites that they may consider for nomination. Nominations for the World Heritage List are only accepted if the site was previously listed on the tentative list. As of January 2026, Syria lists twelve properties on its tentative list.

Tentative sites
Site	Image	Location (governorate)	Year listed	UNESCO criteria	Description
Norias of Hama	The norias of Hama on the Orontes River	Hama Governorate	1999	i, iv (cultural)	The norias lift water from the Orontes River and empty it at the top, pouring their contents into a basin or aqueduct. In Hama, these norias have a diameter of 10-12 metres, but some reach up to 22 metres. Conventionally, they were thought to be medieval Arab in origin. However, they are now thought to predate that date, as an Apamean mosaic from 469 AD depicts one similar to those of Hama. The norias of Hama use hydraulic force instead of animals, and they use leather or terracotta buckets rather than wooden boxes.
Ugarit (Tell Shamra)	A stone entrance leading into a tunnel	Latakia Governorate	1999	iii, vi (cultural)	
Ebla (Tell Mardikh)	An archaeological site next to some fields	Idlib Governorate	1999	iii, vi (cultural)	
Mari (Tell Hariri)	An archaeological site on a hill	Deir ez-Zor Governorate	1999	iii, vi (cultural)	
Dura-Europos	An archaeological site in the desert	Deir ez-Zor Governorate	1999	ii, iv (cultural)	
Apamea (Afamia)	Ruins of pillars	Deir ez-Zor Governorate	1999	iv (cultural)	
Desert Castle: Qasr al-Hayr al-Sharqi	A ruined castle in the desert	Hama Governorate	1999	iv (cultural)	
Ma'loula	A city located upon and next to a cliff	Hama Governorate	1999	iv (cultural)	
Tartus: The City-fortress of the Crusaders	A harbor next to a city	Hama Governorate	1999	iv (cultural)	
Raqqa-Rafiqah: The Abbasid City	A village behind a river	Hama Governorate	1999	iv (cultural)	
Island of Arwad	Satellite image of an island	Tartus Governorate	1999	iv (cultural)	
Mari & Dura-Europos: Sites of Euphrates Valley	A village behind a river	Hama Governorate	2011	iv (cultural)	Mari and Dura-Europos were two ancient cities that provided much archaeological evidence to understand the civilizations (Sumerian, Greek, and Roman) that controlled them, including arts and religious cults. Both being on the Euphrates river, they connected the Mediterranean with Mesopotamia, and the rest of Asia. Mari was a city that was founded in 2900 BCE, at the beginning of urbanisation, while Europos-Dura was founded as a military stronghold by the Seleucid Empire.

== See also ==
- List of Intangible Cultural Heritage elements in Syria
