= Al-Sarafand =

al-Sarafand الصرفند Sarepta Yudee
- Etymology: from a personal name
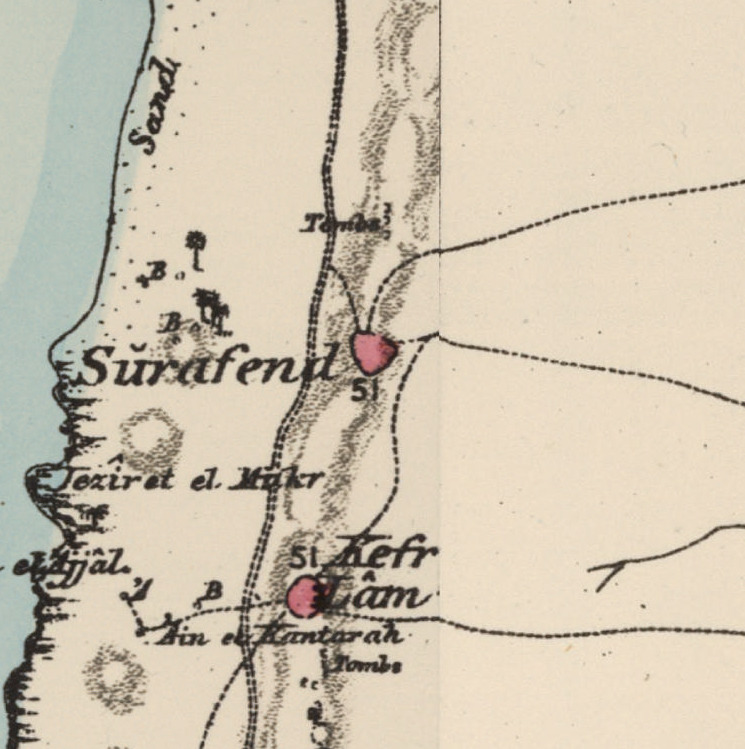
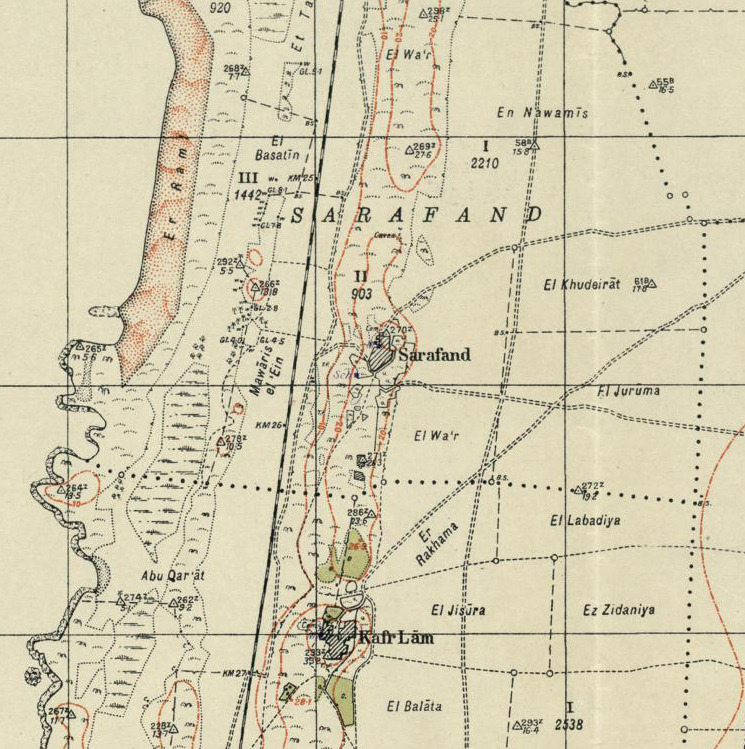
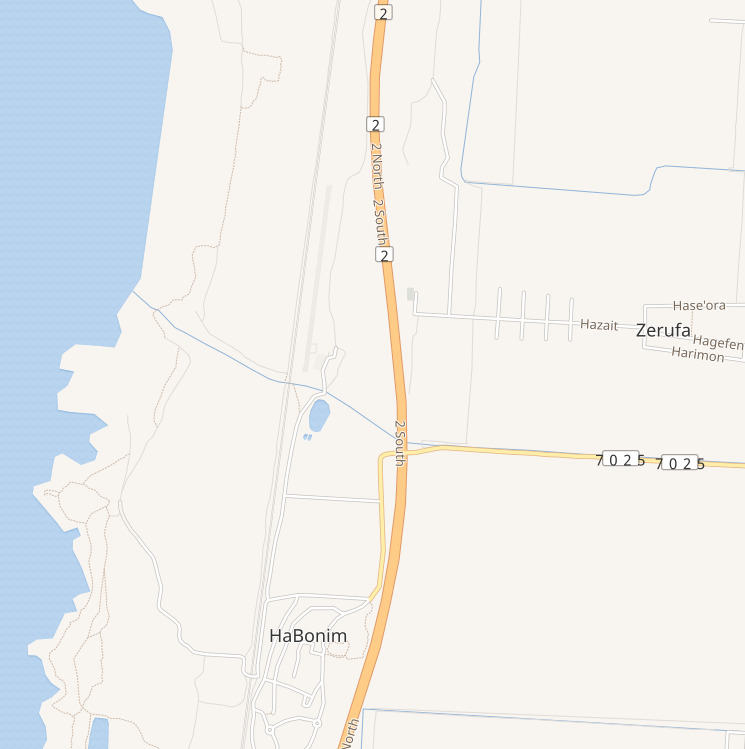
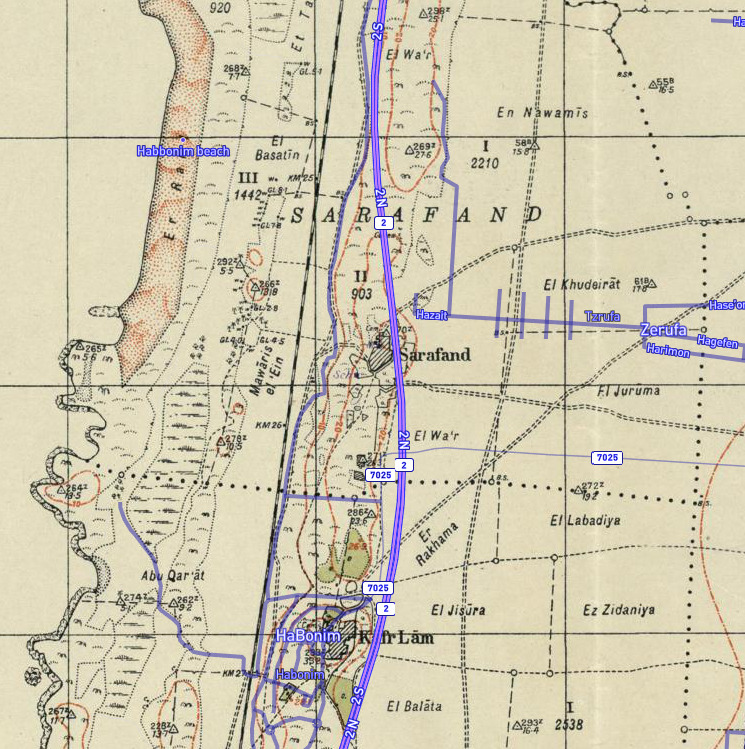
- 1870s map 1940s map modern map 1940s with modern overlay map A series of historical maps of the area around Al-Sarafand (click the buttons)

- Location within Mandatory Palestine
- Coordinates: 32°38′48″N 34°56′08″E
- Palestine grid: 144/228
- Geopolitical entity: Mandatory Palestine
- Subdistrict: Haifa
- Date of depopulation: 16 July 1948

Area
  - Total: 5,409 dunams (5.409 km^{2}; 2.088 sq mi)

Population (1945)
  - Total: 290
- Cause(s) of depopulation: Military assault by Yishuv forces
- Secondary cause: Influence of nearby town's fall
- Current Localities: Tzrufa

Al-Sarafand (Arabic: الصرفند) was a Palestinian Arab village near the Mediterranean shore south of Haifa. In Ottoman tax records, it is shown that the village had a population of 61 inhabitants in 1596. According to a land and population survey by Sami Hadawi, al-Sarafand's population was 290 in 1945, entirely Arab.

== Etymology ==
Sarafand or Sarafend (Ṣarafand / صرفند) is an Arabic rendition of the Phoenician place-name *Ṣrpt. Al-Sarafand was known to the Crusaders as Sarepta Yudee.

== History ==
Pottery remains from the late Roman era and Byzantine era have been found here.

Ayyubid forces captured al-Sarafand from the Crusaders in 1187–1188. The village appears in the waqf of the tomb (turba) and madrasa of amir Qurqamaz in Egypt.

=== Ottoman era ===
In 1517 the village of 'Sarafanda' was incorporated into the Ottoman Empire with the rest of Palestine. During the 16th and 17th centuries, it belonged to the Turabay Emirate (1517–1683), which encompassed also the Jezreel Valley, Haifa, Jenin, Beit She'an Valley, northern Jabal Nablus, Bilad al-Ruha/Ramot Menashe, and the northern part of the Sharon plain.

From Ottoman records it is known that in 1596 Sarafand was a village in the nahiya ("subdistrict") of Shafa, ( liwa' ("district") of Lajjun), with a population of 11 Muslim households, an estimated 61 persons. Villagers paid a fixed tax-rate of 25% to the authorities for the crops that they cultivated, which included wheat, barley, summer crops such as corn, beans, melons, and vegetables, and raising goats; a total of 8,500 akçe.

In 1799, it appeared as the village Sarfend on the map that Pierre Jacotin compiled that year. In 1859 the village of Sarafand was described as being situated on a ridge between a plain and the beach. Consul Rogers estimated that 150 people lived in it and cultivated 16 faddans. Four years later, Victor Guérin stated that the population size was not exceeding 300.

According to the PEF's Survey of Western Palestine, who visited in 1873; "North of this village there is a system of rock- cut tombs, sixteen in all. Eight have each three loculi under arcosolia, and in three cases the rolling stones which closed the doors lie beside them. One of these stones was 3 feet diameter, and 1 foot thick, weighing probably about 6 cwt. Five of the tombs are single loculi, open in front, cut in the face of the cliff under arcosolia; two of the tombs have only two loculi each, and one is blocked up. This group presents the best examples found by the Survey party of the rolling stone arrangement for a tomb door."

A population list from about 1887 showed that Sarafand had about 270 inhabitants; all Muslims.

=== British Mandate era ===
In the 1922 census of Palestine, conducted by the British Mandate authorities, Sarafand had a population of 204; all Muslims, decreasing in the 1931 census to 188; still all Muslim, in a total of 38 houses.

The village economy depended on agriculture, animal husbandry and salt making.

In the 1945 statistics, the village had a population of 290 Muslims, and the village's lands spanned 5,409 dunams. The population was entirely Muslim. A total of 3,244 dunums of land was allocated to cereals; 22 dunums were irrigated or used for orchards, while 6 dunams were built-up (urban) land.

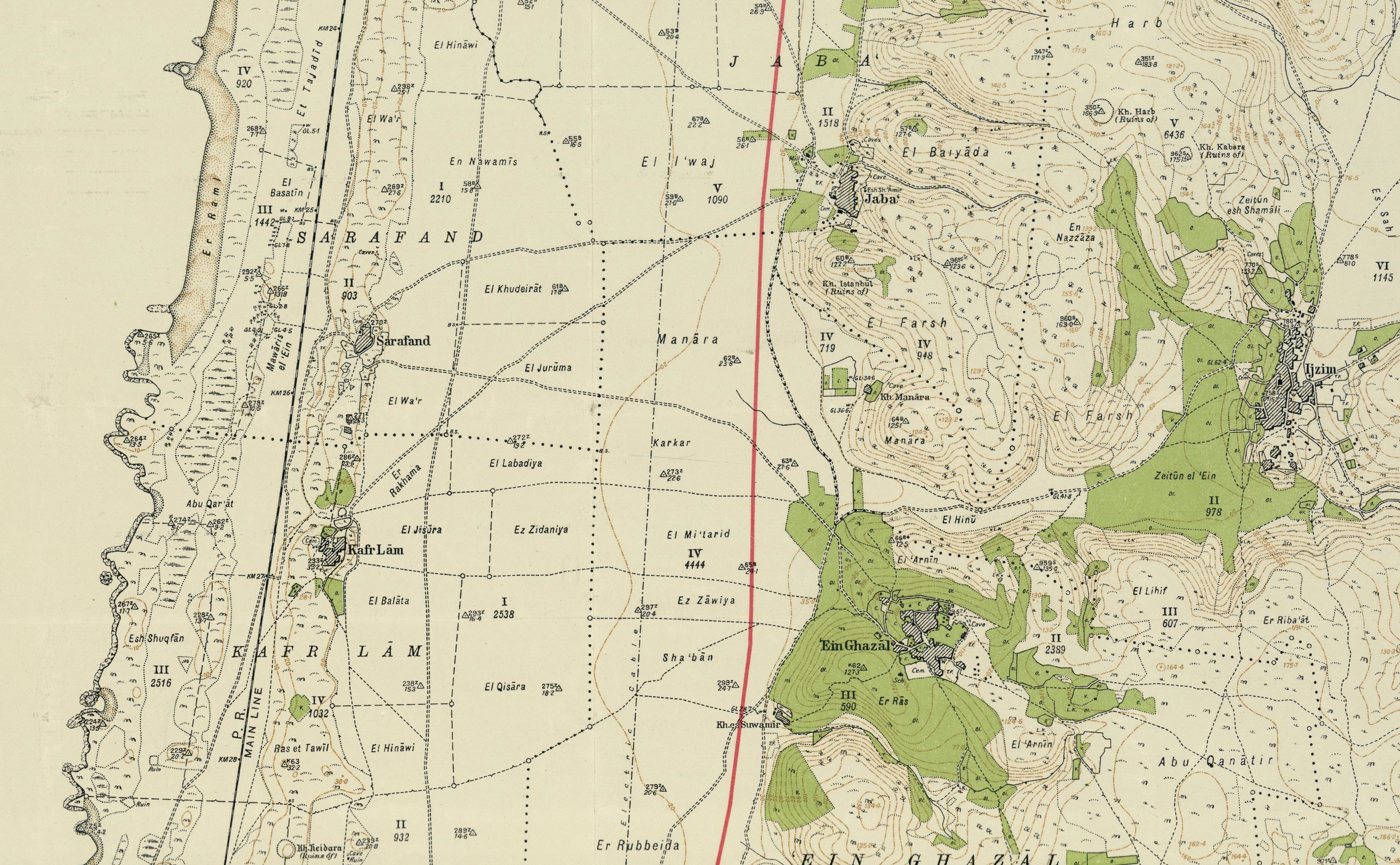
Al-Sarafand (Sarafand) 1938 1:20,000

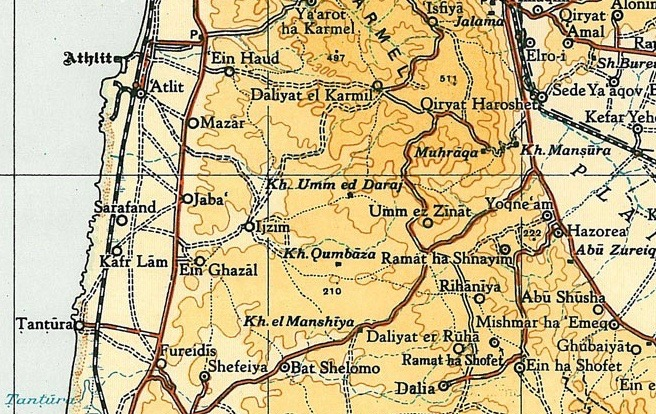
Al-Sarafand (Sarafand) 1945 1:250,000

=== 1948, and aftermath ===
During the 1947–1948 civil war in Mandatory Palestine, the inhabitants were ethnically cleansed in several stages. Most fled in early May towards al-Tira and when al-Tira was depopulated they left for Jenin. Some returned and remained in al-Sarafand until Israeli forces — composed of the Carmeli and Alexandroni Brigades — assaulted the village on July 16, 1948. At the time, Arab Liberation Army volunteers and local militia were defending al-Sarafand. Most of the inhabitants fled to the southeast line of Wadi Ara, where the Iraqi Army was stationed. Later, they crossed the Jordan River, and since then the majority of al-Sarafand's refugees have been living in Jordan. Only one former resident of al-Sarafand remained in Israel. The village houses were not immediately demolished by the Israelis and remained empty for many years. When they were eventually destroyed, the mosque was the only building spared.

Petersen inspected the village mosque and adjacent vaults in 1994, and described the mosque as "a tall rectangular box-like building standing on a terrace near the top of the ridge on which it was built. The mosque is entered through a doorway in the middle of the north wall. The interior is divided into two long cross-vaulted bays resting on six large piers. There are four windows in west wall facing the sea. The mihrab is placed in the centre of the south wall and can be seen on the exterior as a rectangular projection. To the west of the mihrab are the remains of a minbar (now destroyed). The lower sections of the wall are approximately 1 m. thick, whilst the upper part of the south and north walls are considerably thinner (0.3 m.). Although the present building does not appear to be very old (late nineteenth or early twentieth centuries) it does appear to in incorporate an earlier structure which is visible in the exterior walls. To the south of the mosque is a rectangular area of ruins (approximately 30m x 40m) containing several barrel-vaulted chambers. Three of these are still accessible; one on the north side nearest the mosque, and two on the south side next to the quarry cliff. Each vault is about 7m long; one is 2.52m wide and the other is 3.52m wide. More intensive investigation could reveal a basic plan of this structure."

== Mosque restoration ==
In 1999, the 'Aqsa Society for the Preservation of Islamic Holy Sites decided to restore al-Sarafand's mosque. In May 2000, while restoration was on the verge of completion, the mosque was destroyed overnight by a bulldozer. The perpetrator was never identified. The activists covered the ruins by a large tent and maintained a vigil at the site. Removal of the tent was negotiated with the Israeli authorities. It was agreed that the site would be fenced to protect it, but that did not happen and the activists built a more permanent structure. The latter was demolished by the police in March 2002, but the ruined mosque continues to be used for Friday prayers. According to the Or Commission report, Israeli authorities did not grant a license for rebuilding the mosque after the demolition; a decision that contributed to the souring of relations between local Muslim residents and the authorities. The Or Commission report also claims that activities by Islamic organizations such as the aforementioned society may be using religious pretenses to further political aims. The commission describes such actions as a factor in 'inflaming' the Muslim population in Israel against the authorities, and cites the Sarafand mosque episode, with Muslims' attempts to restore the mosque and Jewish attempts to stop them, as an example of the 'shifting of dynamics' of the relationship between Muslims and the Israeli authorities.

=== Ilan Pappe ===
The Israeli new historian Ilan Pappe has a different story of the events. He writes:"The mosque was a hundred years old when the Israeli government gave the go-ahead to have it bull-dozed on 25 july 2000 ignoring a petition addressed to the then prime minister Ehud Barak, beseeching him not to authorise this official act of vandalism."

== See also ==
- Depopulated Palestinian locations in Israel

== Bibliography ==
- Abu Shama (d.1267) (1969): Livre des deux jardins ("The Book of Two Gardens"). Recueil des Historiens des Croisades, Cited in Petersen (2001).
- Barron, J.B., ed. (1923). Palestine: Report and General Abstracts of the Census of 1922. Government of Palestine.
- Clermont-Ganneau, C.S. (1896). [ARP] Archaeological Researches in Palestine 1873-1874, translated from the French by J. McFarlane. Vol. 2. London: Palestine Exploration Fund. (pp. 123, 100, 124, 126)
- Conder, C.R.; Kitchener, H.H. (1882). The Survey of Western Palestine: Memoirs of the Topography, Orography, Hydrography, and Archaeology. Vol. 2. London: Committee of the Palestine Exploration Fund.
- Government of Palestine, Department of Statistics (1945). Village Statistics, April, 1945.
- Guérin, V. (1875). Description Géographique Historique et Archéologique de la Palestine (in French). Vol. 2: Samarie, pt. 2. Paris: L'Imprimerie Nationale.
- Hadawi, S. (1970). "Village Statistics of 1945: A Classification of Land and Area ownership in Palestine". Palestine Liberation Organization Research Center. Archived from the original on 2018-12-08.
- Hütteroth, W.-D.; Abdulfattah, K. (1977). Historical Geography of Palestine, Transjordan and Southern Syria in the Late 16th Century. Erlanger Geographische Arbeiten, Sonderband 5. Erlangen, Germany: Vorstand der Fränkischen Geographischen Gesellschaft. ISBN 3-920405-41-2.
- Karmon, Y. (1960). "An Analysis of Jacotin's Map of Palestine" (PDF). Israel Exploration Journal. 10 (3): 155–173, 244–253. Archived from the original (PDF) on 2017-12-01.
- Khalidi, W. (1992). All That Remains: The Palestinian Villages Occupied and Depopulated by Israel in 1948. Washington D.C.: Institute for Palestine Studies. ISBN 0-88728-224-5.
- Mills, E., ed. (1932). Census of Palestine 1931. Population of Villages, Towns and Administrative Areas. Jerusalem: Government of Palestine.
- Morris, B. (2004). The Birth of the Palestinian Refugee Problem Revisited. Cambridge University Press. ISBN 978-0-521-00967-6.
- MPF: Ipsirli and al-Tamimi (1982): The Muslim Pious Foundations and Real Estates in Palestine. Gazza, Al-Quds al-Sharif, Nablus and Ajlun Districts according to 16th-Century Ottoman Tahrir Registers, Organisation of Islamic Conference, Istanbul 1402/1982. Cited in Petersen (2002).
- Oren, Eliran (2004-07-09). "Es-Sarafand Final Report" (116). Hadashot Arkheologiyot – Excavations and Surveys in Israel.
- Palmer, E.H. (1881). The Survey of Western Palestine: Arabic and English Name Lists Collected During the Survey by Lieutenants Conder and Kitchener, R. E. Transliterated and Explained by E.H. Palmer. Committee of the Palestine Exploration Fund.
- Petersen, Andrew (2001). A Gazetteer of Buildings in Muslim Palestine (British Academy Monographs in Archaeology). Vol. 1. Oxford University Press. ISBN 978-0-19-727011-0.
- Schumacher, G. (1888). "Population list of the Liwa of Akka". Quarterly Statement - Palestine Exploration Fund. 20: 169–191.
