= Rafael Hayun =

Israeli intelligence operative

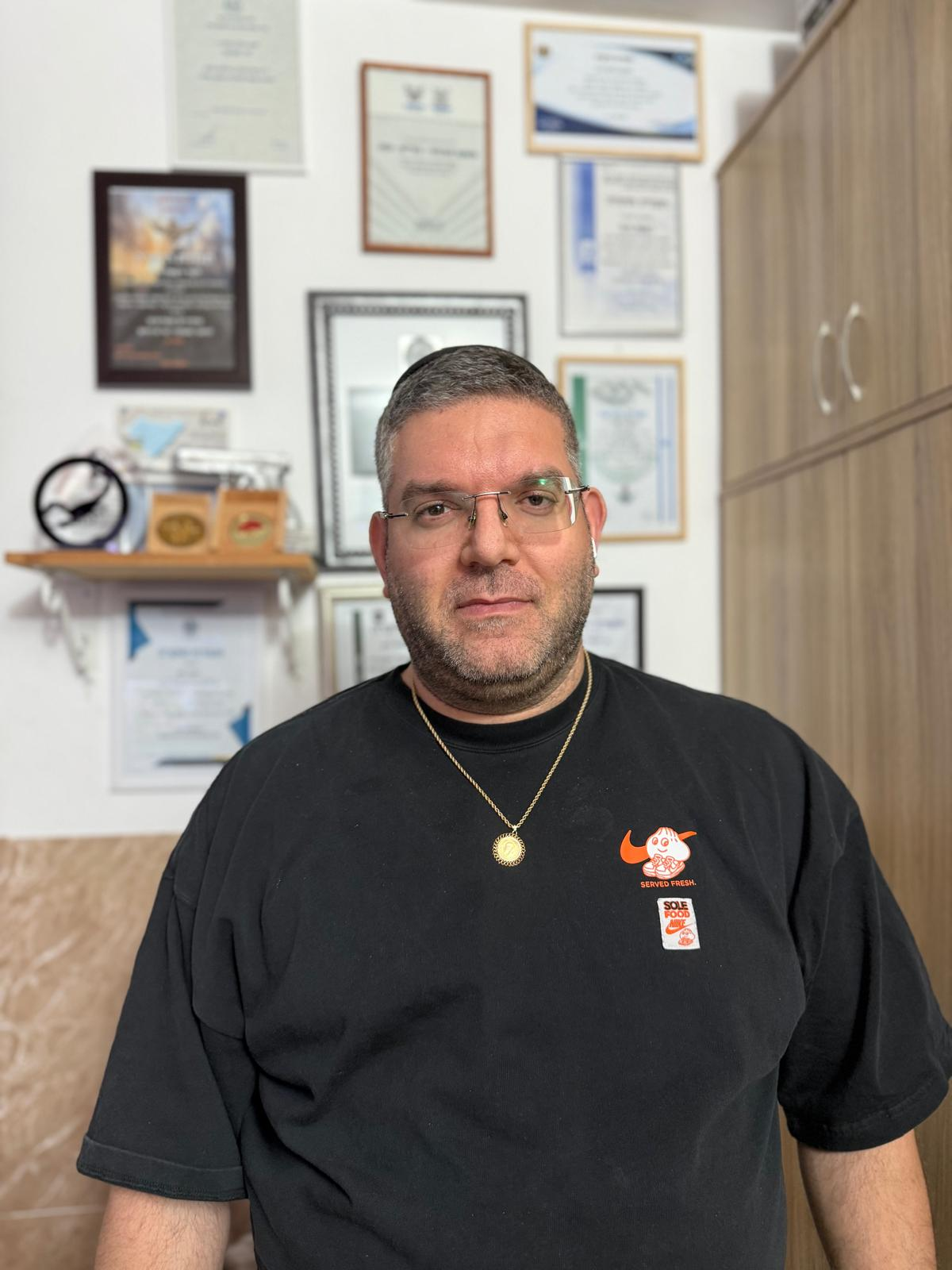
- Rafael Hayun in front of certificates of appreciation awarded by IDF and police units. Photo: Naor Hayun.
- Born: September 5, 1983 (age 42); Tzrufa, Israel
- Known for: Gathering and providing intelligence to the IDF and security forces; assisting in directing military forces during the October 7 massacres

Rafael Hayun (born 5 September 1983) is an Israeli civilian ultra-Orthodox intelligence operative specializing in open-source intelligence (OSINT) and covert collection. Since 2011, he has been transmitting real-time intelligence to the Israel Defense Forces (IDF) and Israeli security agencies. On October 7, 2023, during the October 7 attacks, Hayun played a significant role in guiding IDF forces to various locations under attack, including Kibbutz Holit, Kfar Aza, Nahal Oz, and the Supernova music festival massacre.

== Biography ==
Hayun was born to Ilan and Ilana in the moshav Tzrufa in northern Israel. He studied in Nir Etzion and later moved with his family to Beitar Illit after they became religiously observant. He studied at the Porat Yosef Yeshiva in Katamon, Jerusalem, and later at Kise Rahamim Yeshiva in Bnei Brak. In 1995, the family relocated to Netivot near the Gaza envelope, where Hayun studied at the kollel of Rabbi Yoram Abergel, while also working as a computer technician and lab manager.

=== Intelligence work ===
At age 27, Hayun began intercepting enemy communications and providing intelligence to the military. He received a license from the Israeli Ministry of Communications to own and operate intelligence equipment. He leads a group of about 30 individuals who process and filter information. According to Hayun and testimonies from IDF soldiers, this intelligence often reached field units before official army channels, saving lives.

In late 2022, a senior IDF officer (Col. G.) who headed the Military Censorship and Information Security Department decided to block Hayun's direct contact with field commanders, arguing that the IDF did not require civilian assistance. A recording of this conversation was released in September 2024 by journalist Almog Boker.

On 17 October 2023, The Times of Israel published an investigative article on Hayun's role in tracking Hamas training exercises and the subsequent revocation of his license by the Ministry of Communications and the IDF. The following day, Guy Lerer interviewed Hayun on Channel 13, where he demanded the reinstatement of his license. Within hours, his license was restored. The interview garnered 1.2 million views on TikTok.

Hayun runs several digital intelligence forums followed by many Israeli defense personnel who use them regularly.

== Role on October 7 ==
On the morning of 7 October 2023, Hayun was contacted by hundreds of civilians and military personnel from Gaza-border communities and the Nova festival. He guided IDF units to those areas and helped connect them with local emergency teams and civilians trapped in their homes. His directions were instrumental in sending the first rescue units to Holit, saving lives.

One of the officers he assisted was Lt. Col. Chen Buchris, Deputy Commander of Maglan Unit, who had planned to visit Hayun and present him with a commendation. They remained in contact until minutes before Buchris was killed in battle near Nahal Oz.

Hayun's role in assisting Maglan Unit and other special forces was mentioned in a December 2023 New York Times investigation, as well as in the Jerusalem Post and the German weekly Die Zeit. He was also interviewed in French by i24NEWS.

On 12 September 2024, Hayun testified before the Citizens' Inquiry Committee into the October 7 Attack.

== Recognition ==
For his contributions during the October 7 attacks and the subsequent Operation Iron Swords, Hayun received commendations from the Maglan Unit, units 901 and 444, Duvdevan Unit, Yamas, the Israeli Air Force, Israel Prison Service, Border Police, and others.
