= Wadi Ara, Haifa =

Wadi Ara وادي عارة
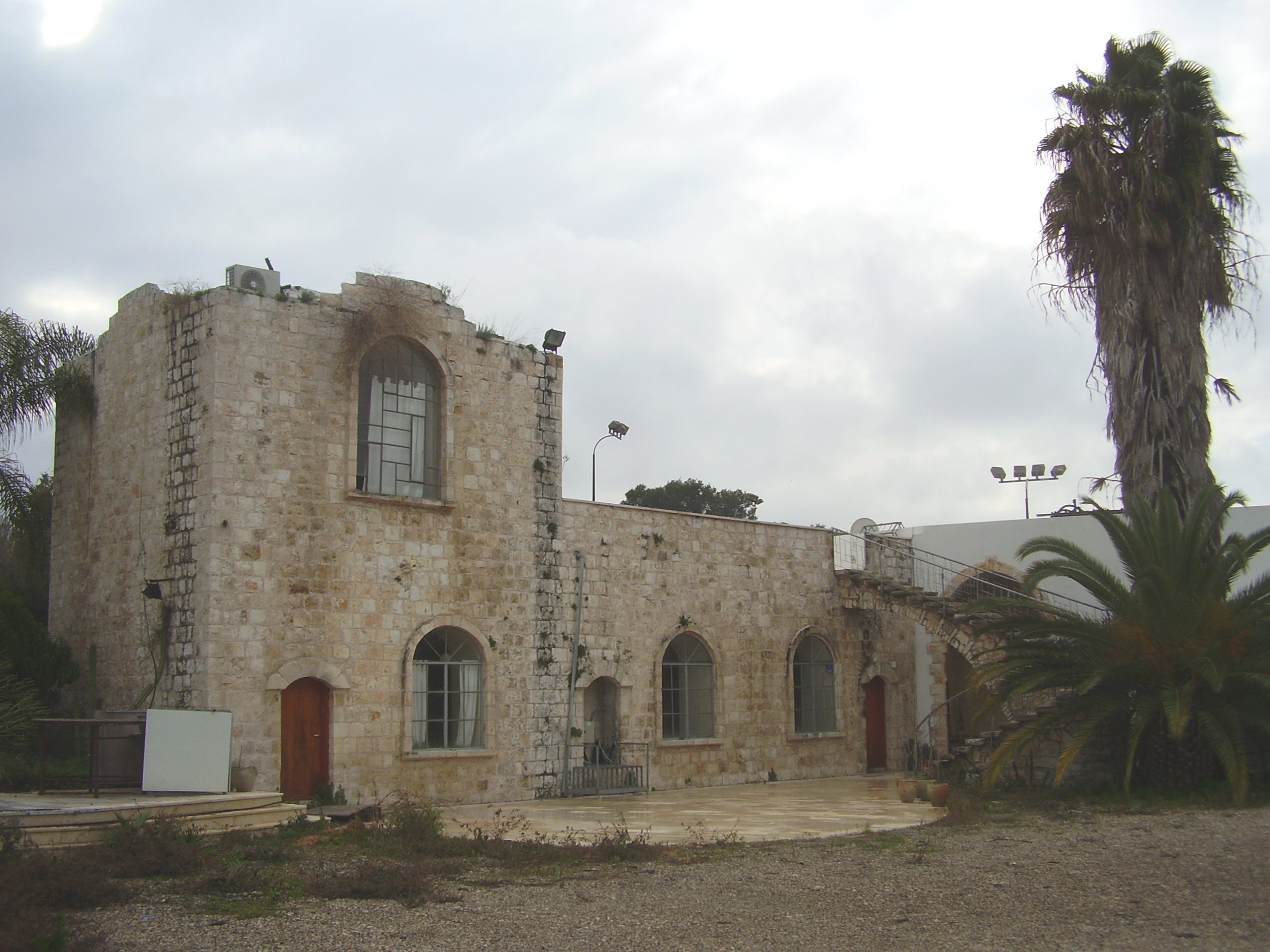
- Old Palestinian house of Wadi Ara, now part of Kibbutz Barkai
- Etymology: Khurbet ez Zebadneh=The ruin if the people of Zebdah
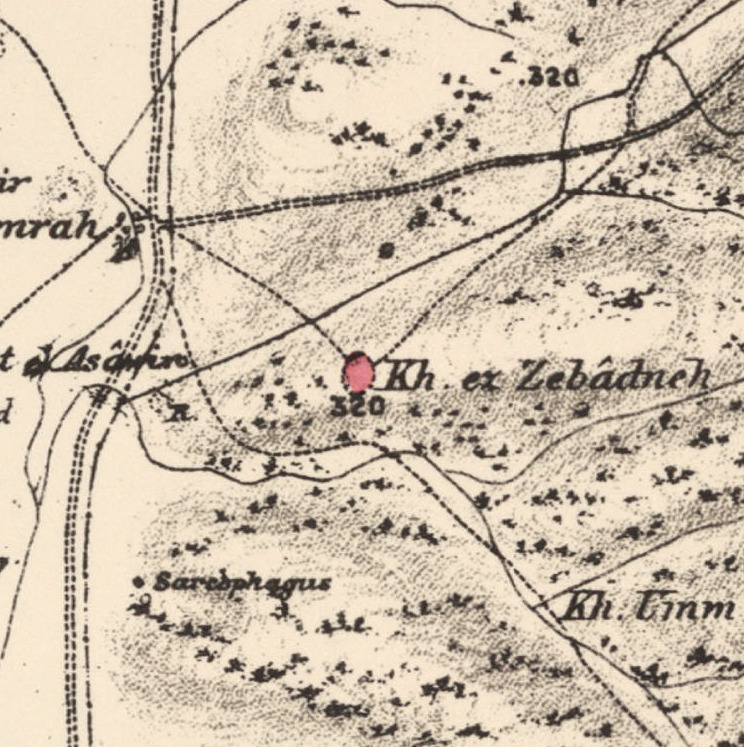
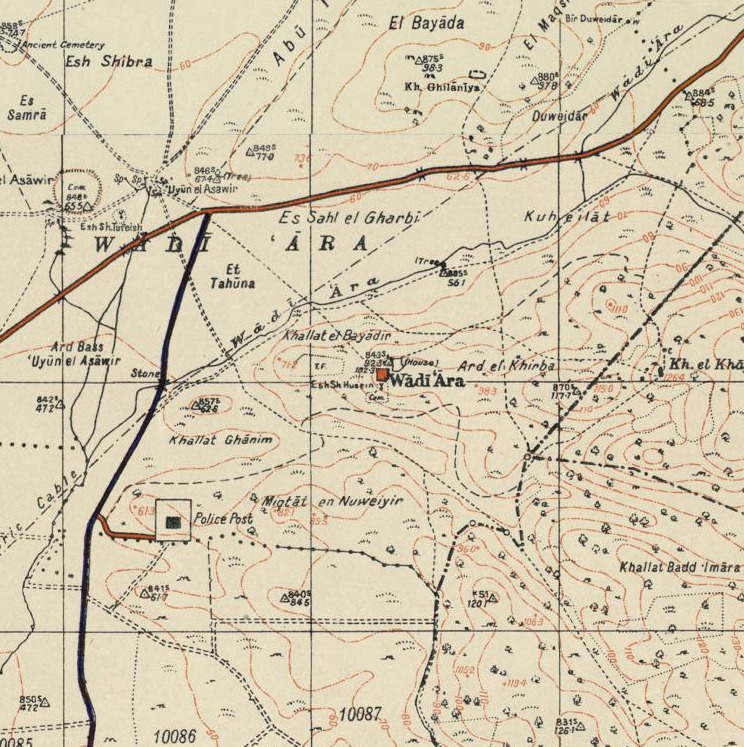
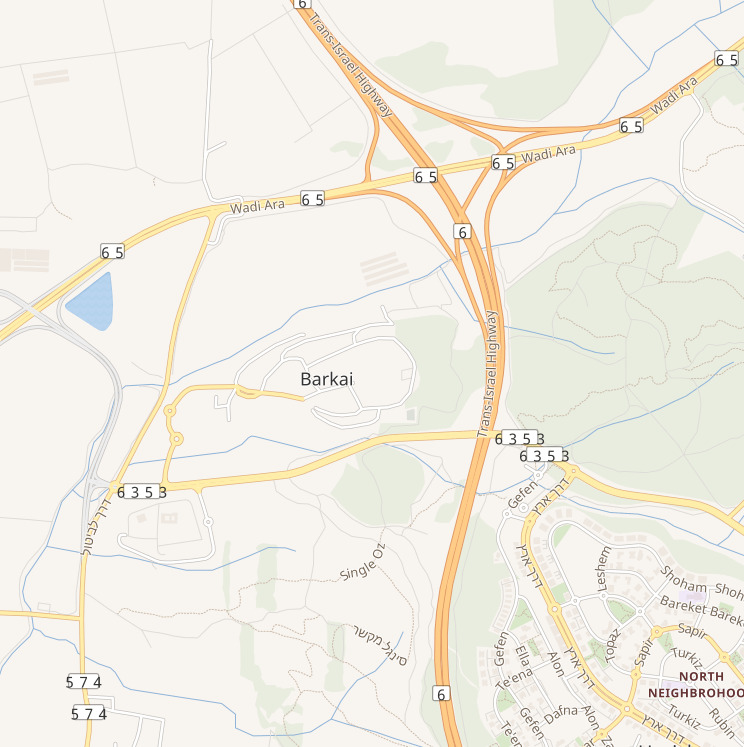
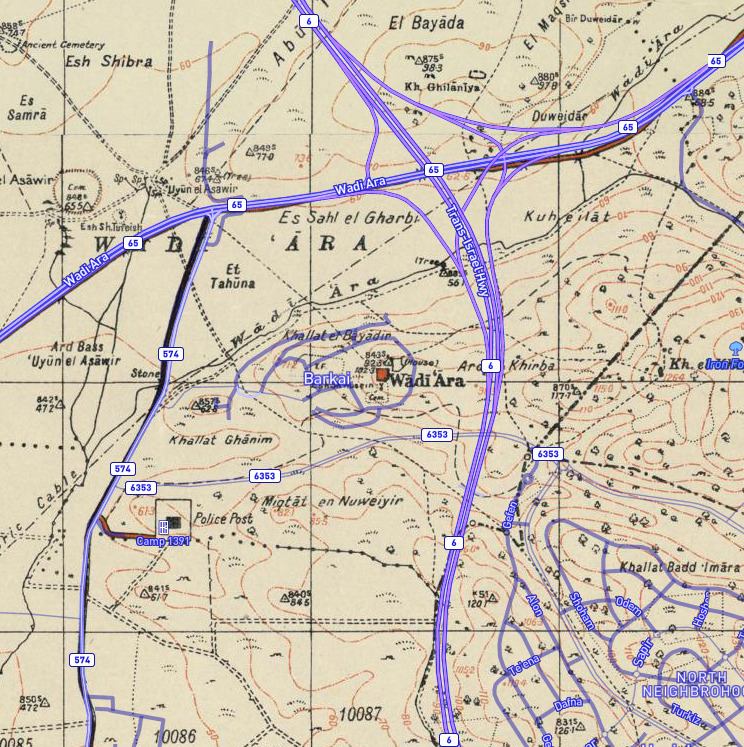
- 1870s map 1940s map modern map 1940s with modern overlay map A series of historical maps of the area around Wadi Ara, Haifa (click the buttons)

- Location within Mandatory Palestine
- Coordinates: 32°28′31″N 35°01′55″E
- Palestine grid: 153/209
- Geopolitical entity: Mandatory Palestine
- Subdistrict: Haifa
- Date of depopulation: February 27, 1948

Area
  - Total: 9,795 dunams (9.795 km^{2}; 3.782 sq mi)
- Elevation: 75 m (246 ft)

Population (1945)
  - Total: 230
- Cause(s) of depopulation: Fear of being caught up in the fighting
- Current Localities: Ein Iron, Barkai

Wadi Ara (Arabic: وادي عارة) was a Palestinian village located 38.5 km south of the city of Haifa. It is named after the nearby stream that is known in Arabic as Wadi 'Ara. The village was particularly small with a population of 230 and a land area of approximately 9,800 dunums.

== History and archaeology ==
=== En Esur: large Chalcolithic and Early Bronze Age settlements ===
At En Esur (Hebrew) or 'Ein Asawir (Arabic), about 1km NW of Wadi Ara, a remarkably large settlement from the Early Chalcolithic period, some 7,000 years ago, has come to light. Its size (400 dunams or 400,000 m²) and some elements of urbanisation might point to a proto-city, at a much earlier time than though possible in the region.

Above the Chalcolithic settlement, a large walled Early Bronze Age city of 650,000 m² (160 acres) covered the site, with up to 6,000 inhabitants – another unparalleled finding for the Southern Levant. Tell el-Asawir, part of the wider En Esur site, contains burial caves dating from the fourth to the second millennium BCE. The press release spoke of "the largest Bronze Age necropolis in the world".

=== Roman to Late Ottoman periods ===
Ceramics from the late Roman, Byzantine, and early Muslim and Middle ages have been found at Khirbet ez-Zebadneh.

The Muslim geographer Ibn Khurdadhbi (d. 912) described it as a stopping place on the road between al-Lajjun and Qalansuwa.

In 1882, the PEF's Survey of Western Palestine described it a small hamlet known as Khurbet ez Zebadneh.

=== British Mandate ===
During the British Mandate of Palestine, the village was classified as a hamlet in the Palestine Index Gazetteer. In the 1922 census of Palestine Wadi Arah had a population of 68; all Muslims, increasing in the 1931 census to 81; still all Muslim, in a total of 18 houses.

The moshav of Ein Iron was built in 1934 on what were traditionally village lands.

In the 1945 statistics Wadi Ara had a population of 230 Muslims, with a total of 9,795 dunams of land. Of this, Arabs used 6,400 dunums of land for cereals, while 1,446 dunams were classified as uncultivable land.

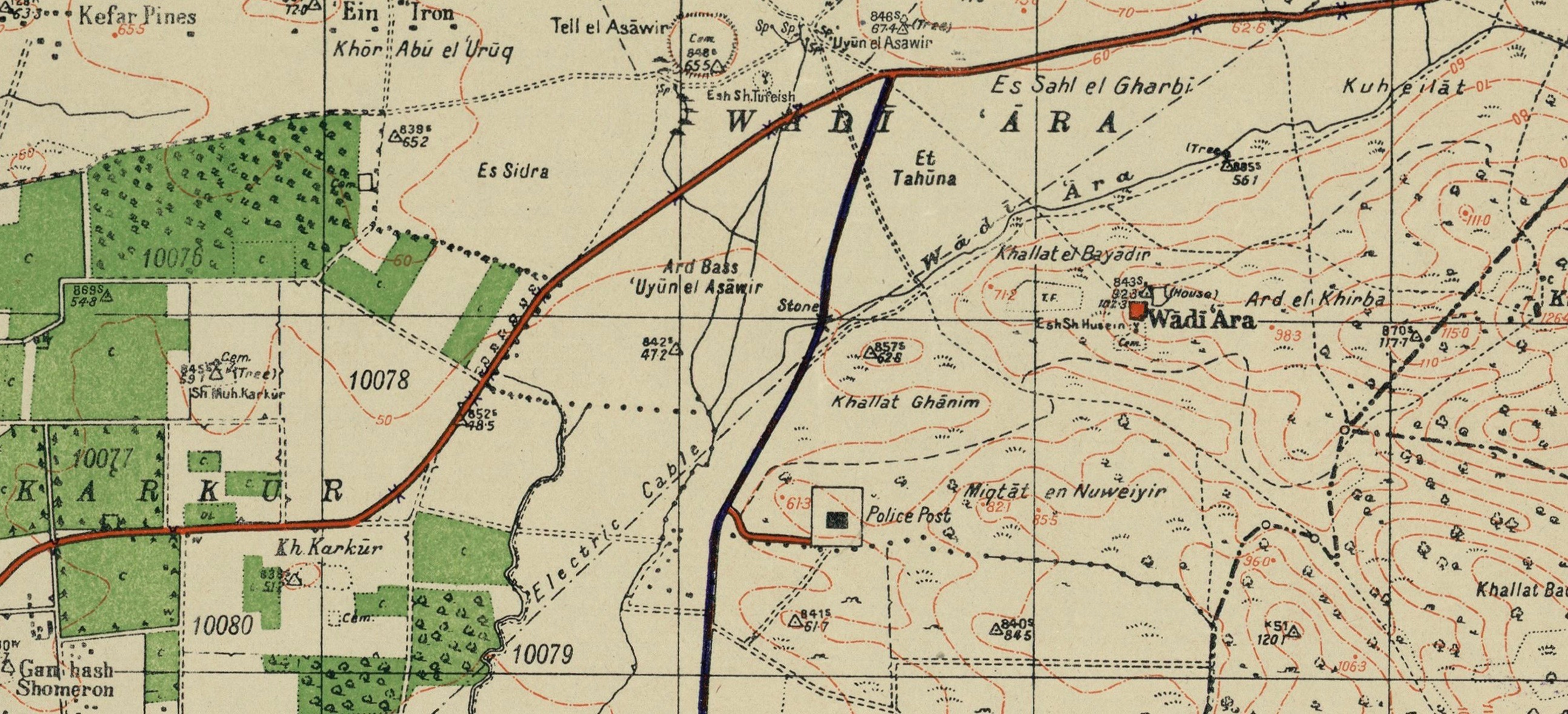
Wadi 'Ara 1942 1:20,000

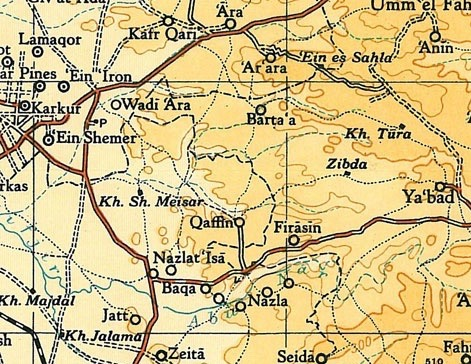
Wadi 'Ara 1945 1:250,000

=== 1948 War and aftermath ===
During the 1948 Arab-Israeli War the village was successfully defended by Arab Liberation Army volunteers and Iraqi forces patrolling the nearby city of Tulkarm. However, locals in the area experienced violence at the hands of Israeli forces; A member of kibbutz Be'eri, assigned to the Guard Milices testified in a study undertaken by Israeli historian Yitzhaki and Uri Milstein: "We were in Wadi 'Ara. We raided a nearby Palestinian post and brought a prisoner for interrogation. A soldier beheaded him and scalped his head by knife. He raised the head on a pole to strike fear among Palestinians. Nobody stopped him." Most non-Jewish residents were removed on February 27, 1948 prior to the official founding of the modern state of Israel, those remaining were removed by the end of July 1949.

In March 1949 as the Iraqi forces withdrew from Palestine and handed over their positions to the smaller Jordanian legion, three Israeli brigades manoeuvred into threatening positions in Operation Shin-Tav-Shin in a form of coercive diplomacy. The operation allowed Israel to renegotiate the ceasefire line in the Wadi Ara area of the northern West Bank in a secret agreement reached on 23 March 1949 and incorporated into the General Armistice Agreement. The green line was then redrawn in blue ink on the southern map to give the impression that a movement in the green line had been made. Jordan ceded the entire Wadi Ara region to Israel on May 3, 1949.

Following the area's incorporation into Israel, kibbutz Barkai was established on the site of Wadi Ara on May 10, 1949. In 1992 Palestinian historian Walid Khalidi described the remaining structures on the village land: "Only two village houses remain, both on the eastern edge of the site. One of them has arched windows and a spiral staircase leading up to a room on the roof. The second has a large entrance that is used today as a gate for the kibbutz's swimming pool."

Petersen inspected the remaining buildings in 1994, and described them as "a large rectangular building which appears to be of late Ottoman date. On the ground floor is a long hall (18.8m x 6.9m) roofed by three cross-vaults. On the upper floor is a large terrace and a single cross-vaulted room. South of this building are the remains of a high wall and a monumental gateway which now gives access to the Kibbutz swimming pool. It is likely that both buildings date to the latter part of the Ottoman period (i.e. 1880-1917)".

== See also ==
- Depopulated Palestinian locations in Israel
- Wadi Ara

== Bibliography ==
- Barron, J. B., ed. (1923). Palestine: Report and General Abstracts of the Census of 1922. Government of Palestine.
- Conder, C.R.; Kitchener, H.H. (1882). The Survey of Western Palestine: Memoirs of the Topography, Orography, Hydrography, and Archaeology. Vol. 2. London: Committee of the Palestine Exploration Fund.
- Dauphin, C. (1998). La Palestine byzantine, Peuplement et Populations. BAR International Series 726 (in French). Vol. III : Catalogue. Oxford: Archeopress. ISBN 0-860549-05-4.
- Department of Statistics (1945). Village Statistics, April, 1945. Government of Palestine.
- Hadawi, S. (1970). Village Statistics of 1945: A Classification of Land and Area ownership in Palestine. Palestine Liberation Organization Research Center.
- Khalidi, W. (1992). All That Remains: The Palestinian Villages Occupied and Depopulated by Israel in 1948. Washington D.C.: Institute for Palestine Studies. ISBN 0-88728-224-5.
- Mills, E., ed. (1932). Census of Palestine 1931. Population of Villages, Towns and Administrative Areas. Jerusalem: Government of Palestine.
- Morris, B. (2004). The Birth of the Palestinian Refugee Problem Revisited. Cambridge University Press. ISBN 978-0-521-00967-6.
- Palmer, E.H. (1881). The Survey of Western Palestine: Arabic and English Name Lists Collected During the Survey by Lieutenants Conder and Kitchener, R. E. Transliterated and Explained by E.H. Palmer. Committee of the Palestine Exploration Fund.
- Petersen, Andrew (2001). A Gazetteer of Buildings in Muslim Palestine (British Academy Monographs in Archaeology). Vol. 1. Oxford University Press. ISBN 978-0-19-727011-0.
- al-Qawuqji, F. (1972): Memoirs of al-Qawuqji, Fauzi in Journal of Palestine Studies
  - "Memoirs, 1948, Part I" in 1, no. 4 (Sum. 72): 27-58., dpf-file, downloadable
  - "Memoirs, 1948, Part II" in 2, no. 1 (Aut. 72): 3-33., dpf-file, downloadable
- Shlaim, A. (2004). The Politics of Partition; King Abdullah, The Zionists, and Palestine 1921-1951. Boston: Oxford University Press, revised edition. ISBN 0-19-829459-X.
- Zertal, A. (2016). The Manasseh Hill Country Survey. Vol. 3. Boston: BRILL. ISBN 978-9004312302.
