= Barkai =

Kibbutz in Israel

Barkai: בַּרְקַאי (Hebrew)
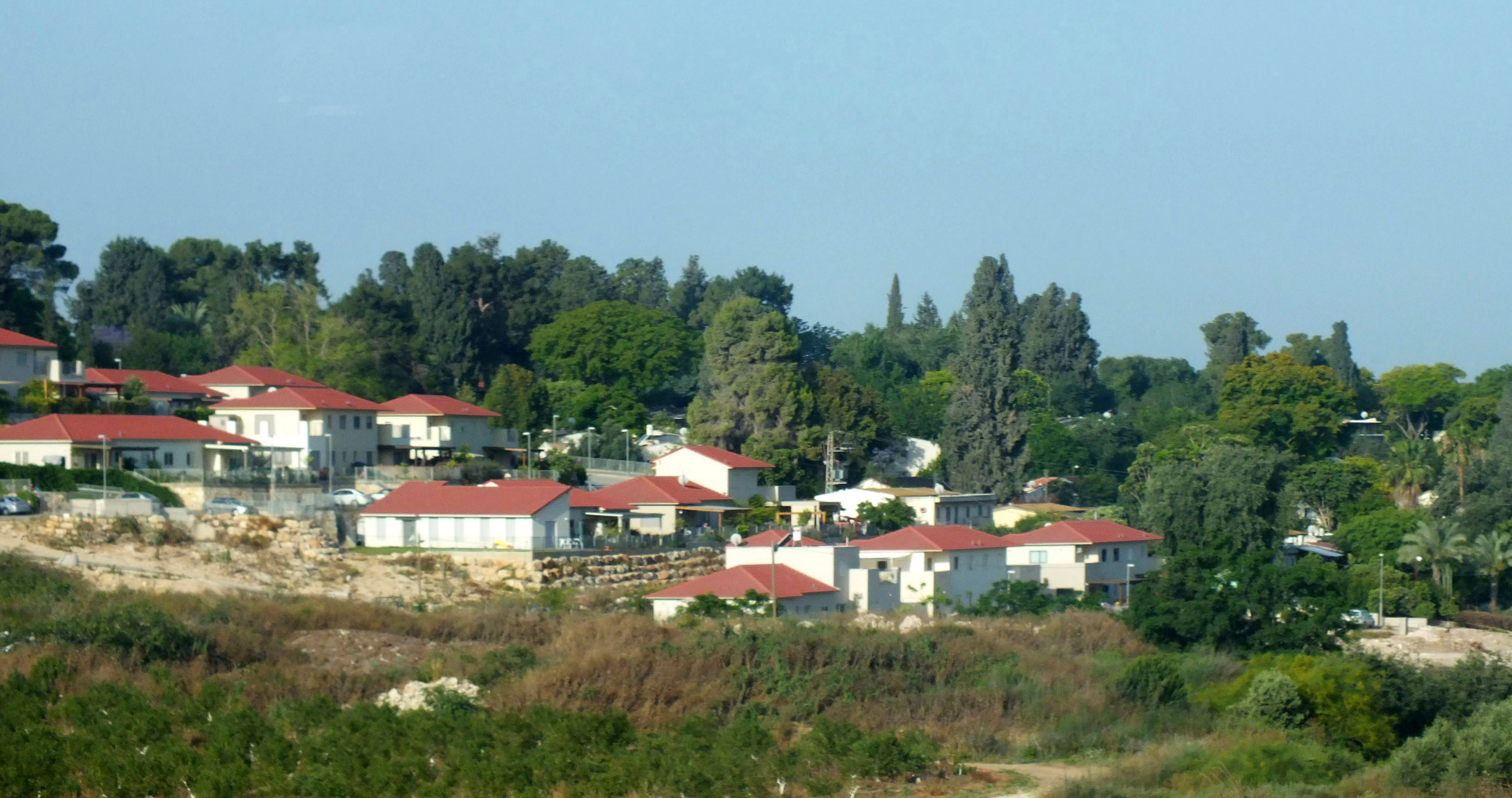
- Etymology: Morning star
- Location within Haifa region of Israel Location within Israel
- Coordinates: 32°28′31″N 35°1′45″E
- Country: Israel
- District: Haifa
- Subdistrict: Hadera
- Council: Menashe
- Region: Wadi Ara
- Affiliation: Kibbutz Movement
- Founded: 10 May 1949
- Founder: Romanian and Polish Jews
- Population (2024): 566
- Website: www.barkai.org.il

Barkai (Hebrew: בַּרְקַאי, lit. 'morning star') is an Israeli kibbutz in the Menashe Regional Council on the western side of Wadi Ara. In 2024, it had a population of 566.

== History ==
Kibbutz Barkai was founded on 10 May 1949 on land near the depopulated Palestinian village of Wadi Ara.

Economic branches include thermal and acoustic insulation, lamination and packaging: the Polyon Barkai factory; and agriculture: cattle, poultry, avocado and field crops.

Infimer Technologies manufactures a recycled composite polymer that serves as raw material for plastic manufacturers. Combined with virgin plastic, it is used to make chairs, tables, crates, plumbing pipes and toolboxes.

== Panorama ==
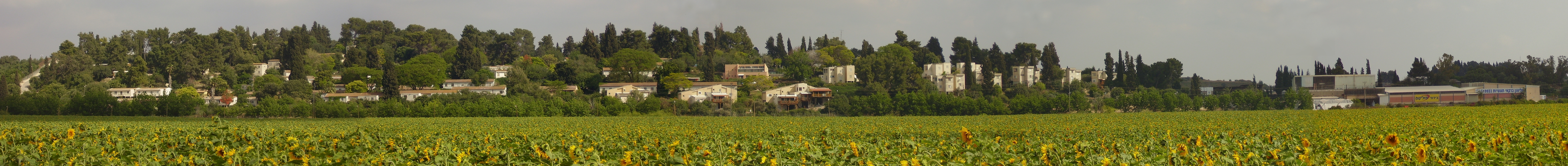
Panorama of the kibbutz
