= Tzrufa =

- Location within Haifa region of Israel Location within Israel
- Coordinates: 32°38′55″N 34°56′42″E
- Country: Israel
- District: Haifa
- Subdistrict: Hadera
- Council: Hof HaCarmel
- Affiliation: Moshavim Movement
- Founded: 1949
- Founder: Algerian and Tunisian immigrants
- Population (2024): 1,287

Tzrufa (Hebrew: צְרוּפָה) is a moshav in northern Israel. Located near Atlit, it falls under the jurisdiction of Hof HaCarmel Regional Council. In 2024 it had a population of 1,287.

== History ==
The village was established in 1949 by immigrants from Algeria and Tunisia. The village was named after the depopulated Palestinian village of al-Sarafand near which it was built. There is an inscription at the village entrance which states ""The word of the Lord is pure [tzrufa]; He is a shield to all them that take refuge in him" (Psalms 18:30)," but this is not the origin of the village's name. During the Crusader period, the village was known as Sarepta Yudee, possibly to distinguish it from Sarepta of Lebanon. Both names means "smelting place." Roman and Byzantine pottery remains have been found on site. During the Crusader era, a fortress and chapel were built. The remains of the village mosque can still be seen.

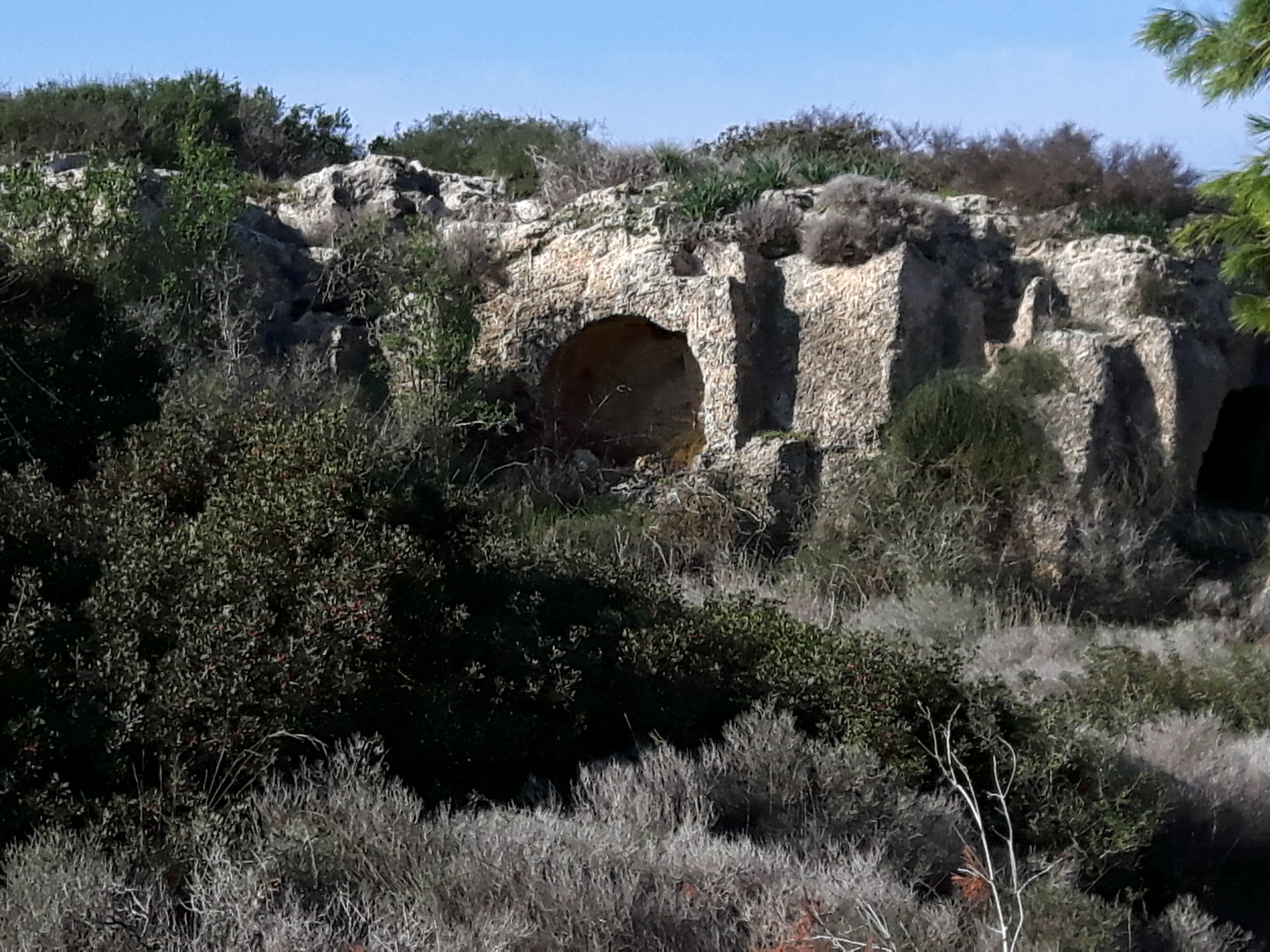
Large quarry area with rock-cut burial caves

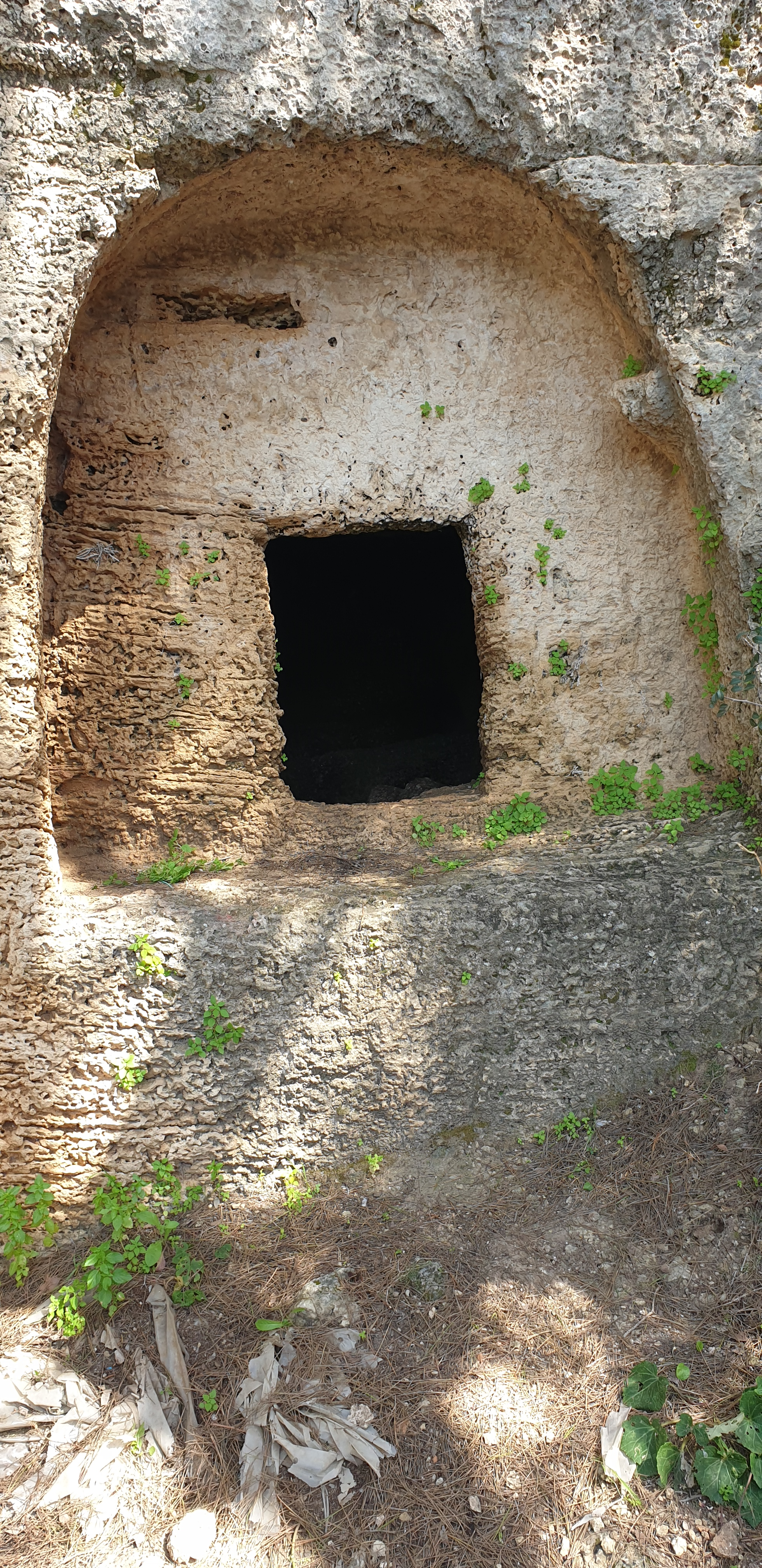
Rock-cut burial cave with a niche for a burial stone
