= History of cities =

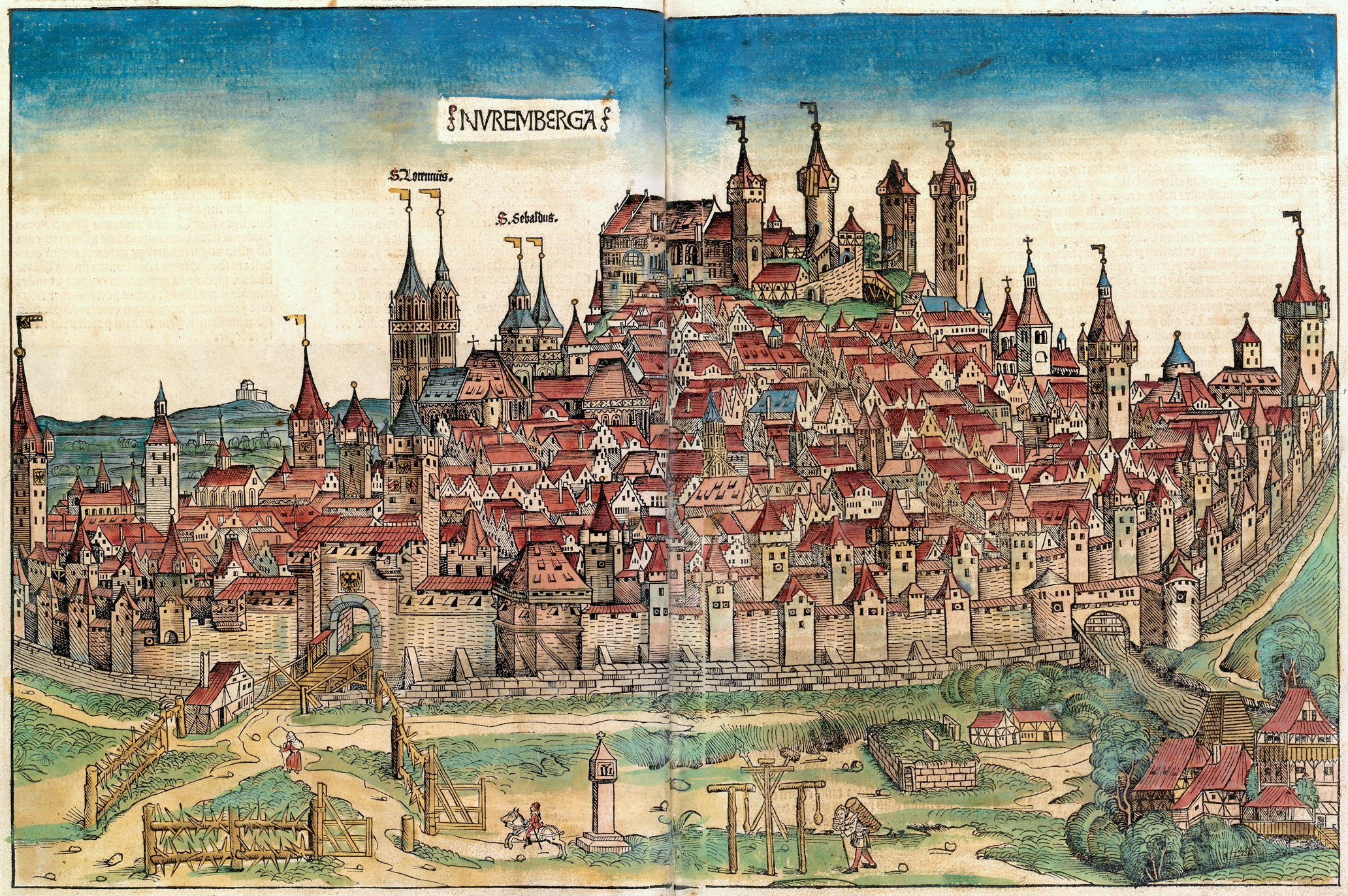
This woodcut shows Nuremberg as a prototype of a flourishing and independent city in the 15th century.

Towns and cities have a long history, although opinions vary on which ancient settlements are truly cities. Historically, the benefits of dense, permanent settlement were numerous, but required prohibitive amounts of food and labor to maintain. Ancient cities allowed for the pooling of resources, exchange of ideas, large marketplaces, and even some shared amenities such as drinking water, sewerage, law enforcement, and roads. The first cities formed and grew once these benefits of proximity between people exceeded the cost of work required to maintain a settlement. Various technologies such as bricks, pottery, and animal taming played a large role in the costs and benefits of maintaining the earliest forms of cities.

== Origins ==
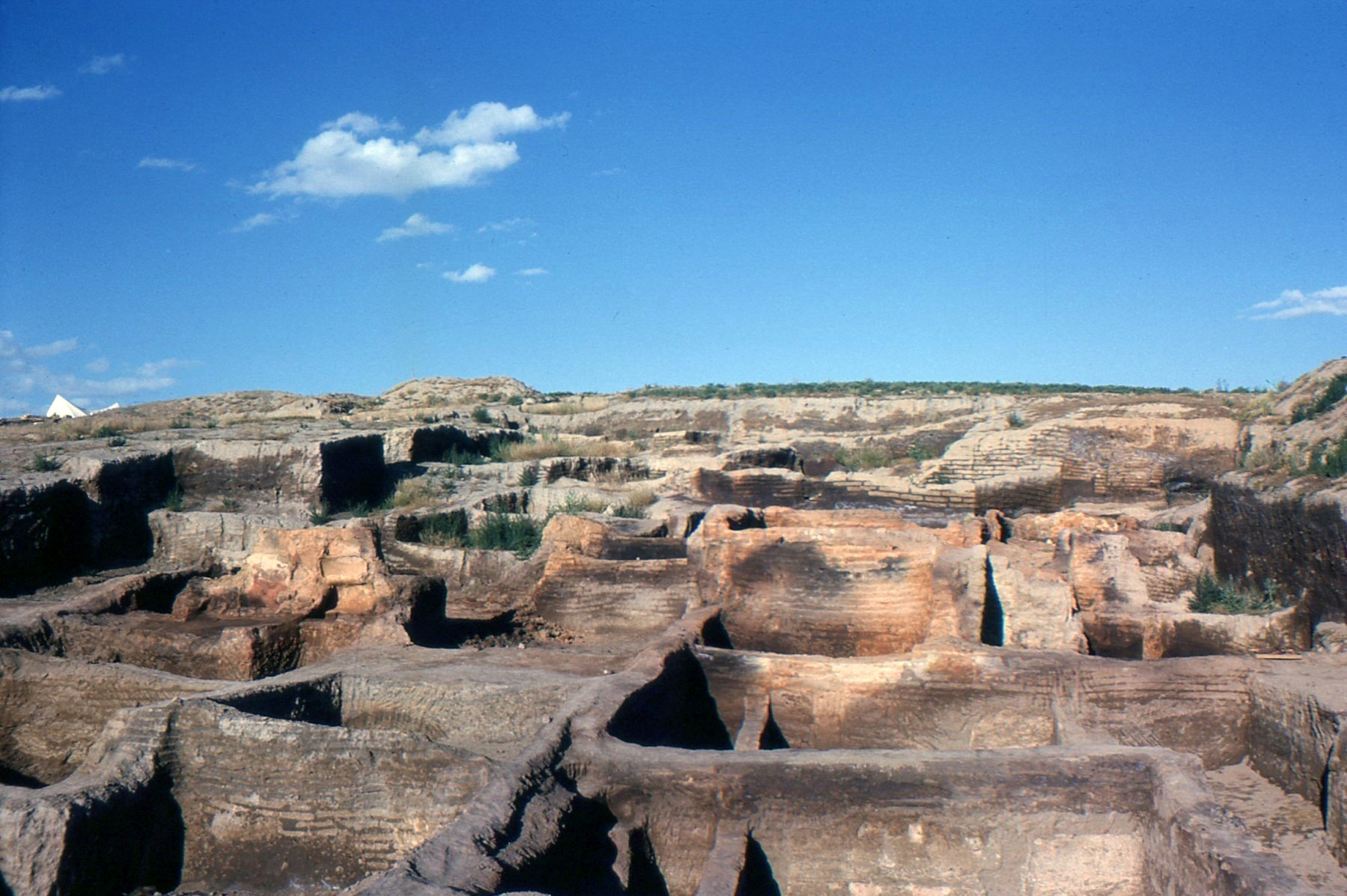
Excavated foundations of Çatalhöyük, Turkey. An Anatolian town dated to 7000 BCE.

There is not enough evidence to assert with certainty what conditions gave rise to the first cities. Smaller human settlements (such as villages) pre-date cities by many thousands of years. Before permanent settlement in cities, there were also large temporary settlements used for religious purposes or as a stopping place for nomadic people.

Anthropologists speculate on what they consider suitable pre-conditions and basic mechanisms that might have been important driving forces in the shift to permanent settlement. The conventional view holds that cities first formed after the Neolithic Revolution, and the introduction of agriculture. The ability to produce food from a fixed location made permanent settlements much more attractive to ancient people. However, whether farming immigrants replaced foragers or foragers began farming is not clear. The increased food production per unit of land supported higher population density and more city-like activities in areas suitable for agriculture. In the book, Cities and Economic Development, Paul Bairoch takes up this position in his argument that agriculture and a surplus of food is necessary before cities can form.

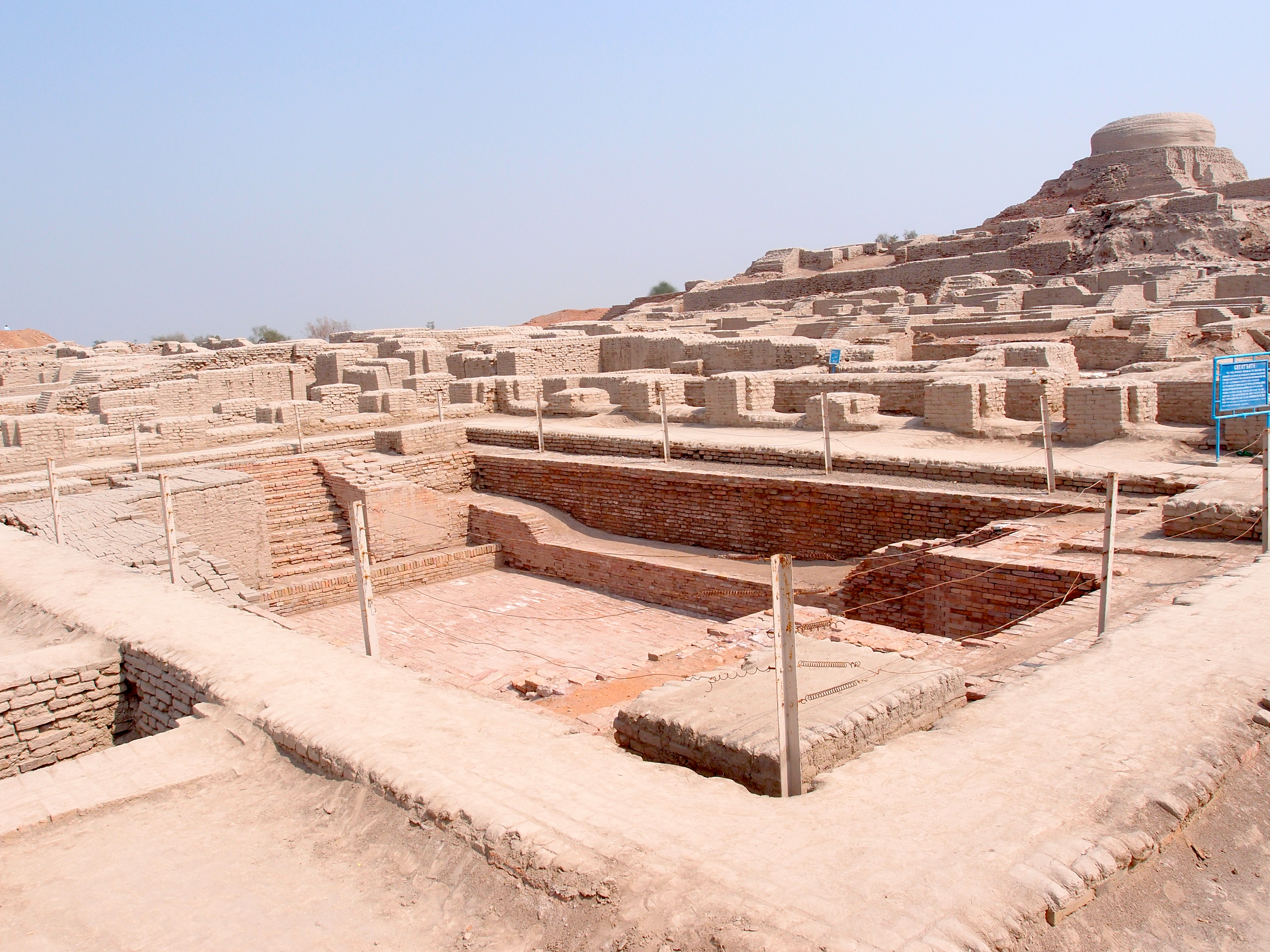
Mohenjo-daro, a World Heritage Site that was part of the Indus Valley Civilization

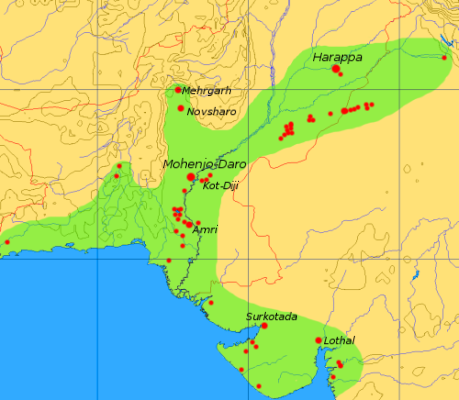
Extent and major sites of the Indus Valley Civilization of ancient India

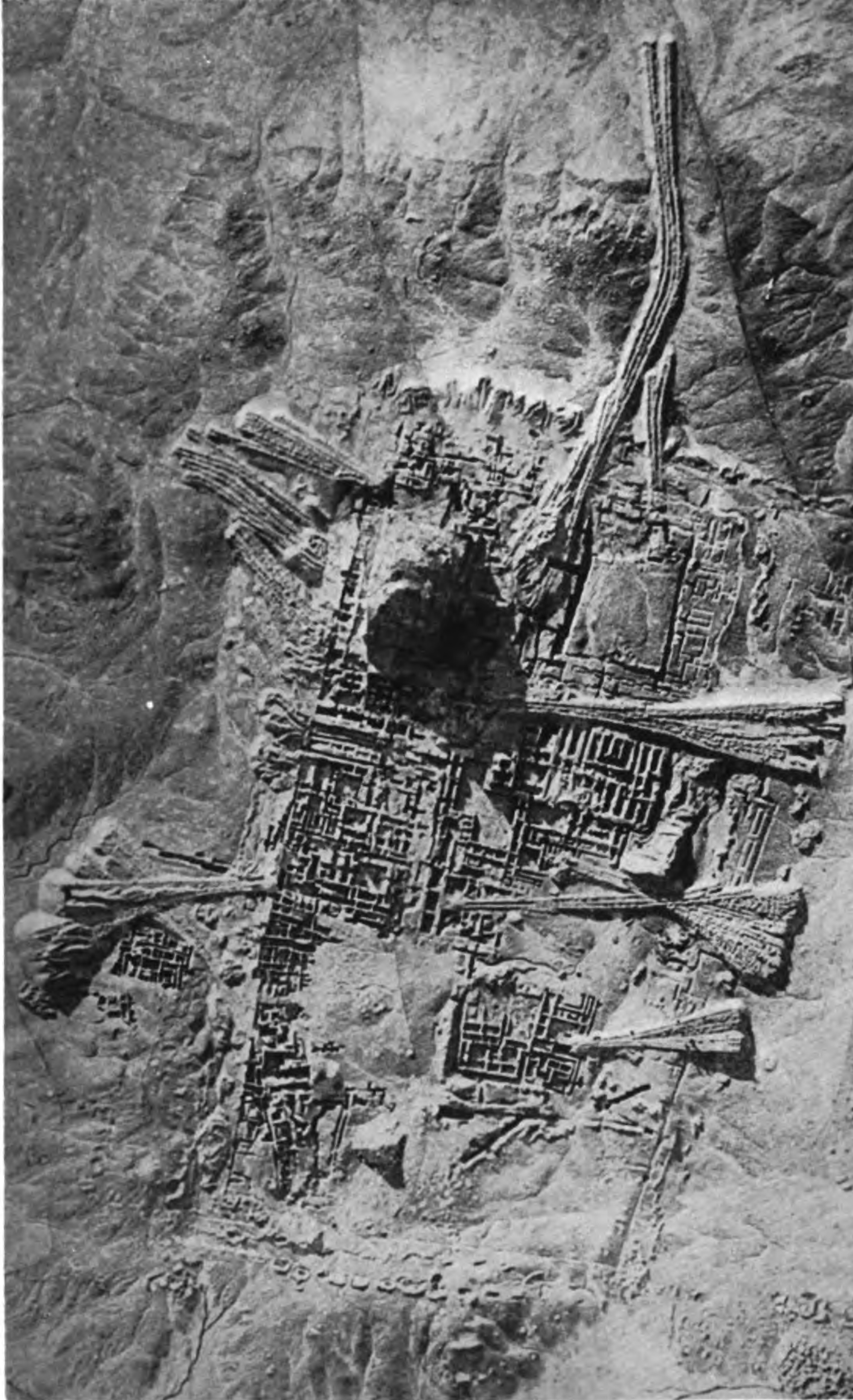
Aerial photograph shows the remains of the Sumerian city Ur, near Nasiriyah, Iraq.

According to V. Gordon Childe, for a settlement to qualify as a city, it must have enough surplus of raw materials to support trade and a relatively large population. Bairoch points out that, due to sparse population densities that would have persisted in pre-Neolithic, hunter-gatherer societies, the amount of land that would be required to produce enough food for subsistence and trade for a large population would make it impossible to control the flow of trade. To illustrate this point, Bairoch offers an example: "Western Europe during the pre-Neolithic, [where] the density must have been less than 0.1 person per square kilometre". Using this population density as a base for calculation, and allotting 10% of food towards surplus for trade and assuming that city dwellers do no farming, he calculates that "...to maintain a city with a population of 1,000, and without taking the cost of transport into account, an area of 100,000 square kilometres would have been required. When the cost of transport is taken into account, the figure rises to 200,000 square kilometres ...". Bairoch noted that this is roughly the size of Great Britain. The urban theorist Jane Jacobs suggests that city formation preceded the birth of agriculture, but this view is not widely accepted.

In his book City Economics, Brendan O'Flaherty asserts "Cities could persist—as they have for thousands of years—only if their advantages offset the disadvantages". O'Flaherty illustrates two similar attracting advantages known as increasing returns to scale and economies of scale, which are concepts usually associated with businesses. Their applications are seen in more basic economic systems as well. Increasing returns to scale occurs when "doubling all inputs more than doubles the output [and] an activity has economies of scale if doubling output less than doubles cost".

Similarly, "Are Cities Dying?", a paper by Harvard economist Edward L. Glaeser, delves into similar reasons for city formation: reduced transport costs for goods, people and ideas. Discussing the benefits of proximity, Glaeser claims that if a city is doubled in size, workers get a ten percent increase in earnings. Glaeser furthers his argument by stating that bigger cities do not pay more for equal productivity than in a smaller city, so it is reasonable to assume that workers become more productive if they move to a city twice the size as they initially worked in. The workers do not benefit much from the ten percent wage increase, because it is recycled back into the higher cost of living in a larger city.

=== Childe's ten criteria ===
The first true towns are sometimes considered large settlements where the inhabitants were no longer simply farmers of the surrounding area, but began to take on specialized occupations, and where trade, food storage and power were centralized. In 1950 Gordon Childe attempted to define a historic city with ten general metrics. These are:

1. Size and density of the population should be above normal.
2. Differentiation of the population. Not all residents grow their own food, leading to specialists.
3. Payment of taxes to a deity or king.
4. Monumental public buildings.
5. Those not producing their own food are supported by the king.
6. Systems of recording and practical science.
7. A system of writing.
8. Development of symbolic art.
9. Trade and import of raw materials.
10. Specialist craftsmen from outside the kin-group.

This categorisation is descriptive, and it is used as a general touchstone when considering ancient cities, although not all have each of its characteristics.

== Ancient times ==
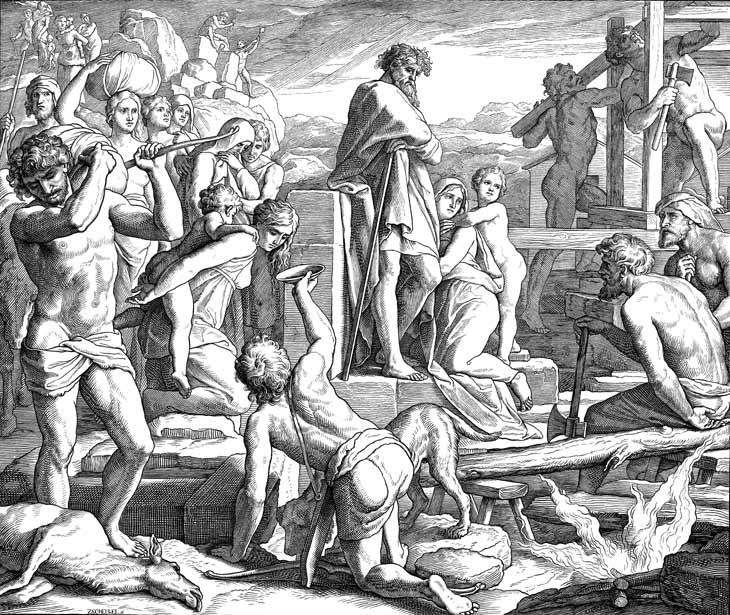
Cain founding the city of Enoch

The more complex human societies, called the first civilizations, emerged around 3000 BCE in the river valleys of Mesopotamia, Minoan Crete, the Indus Valley Civilization, China, and Egypt. An increase in food production led to the significant growth in human population and the rise of cities. The peoples of Southwest Asia and Egypt laid the foundations of Western civilization: they developed cities and struggled with the problems of organised states as they moved from individual communities to larger territorial units and eventually to empires. Among these early civilizations, Egypt is exceptional for its apparent lack of big cities.

The growth of the population of ancient civilizations, the formation of ancient empires concentrating political power, and the growth in commerce and manufacturing led to ever greater capital cities and centres of commerce and industry, with Alexandria, Antioch and Seleucia of the Hellenistic civilization, Pataliputra (now Patna) in India, Chang'an (now Xi'an) in China, Carthage, ancient Rome and its eastern successor Constantinople (now Istanbul).

The roster of early urban traditions is notable for its diversity. Excavations at early urban sites show that some cities were sparsely populated political capitals, others were trade centers, and still other cities had a primarily religious focus. Some cities had large dense populations, whereas others carried out urban activities in the realms of politics or religion without having large associated populations. Theories that attempt to explain ancient urbanism by a single factor, such as economic benefit, fail to capture the range of variation documented by archaeologists.

=== Mediterranean and Mesopotamia ===
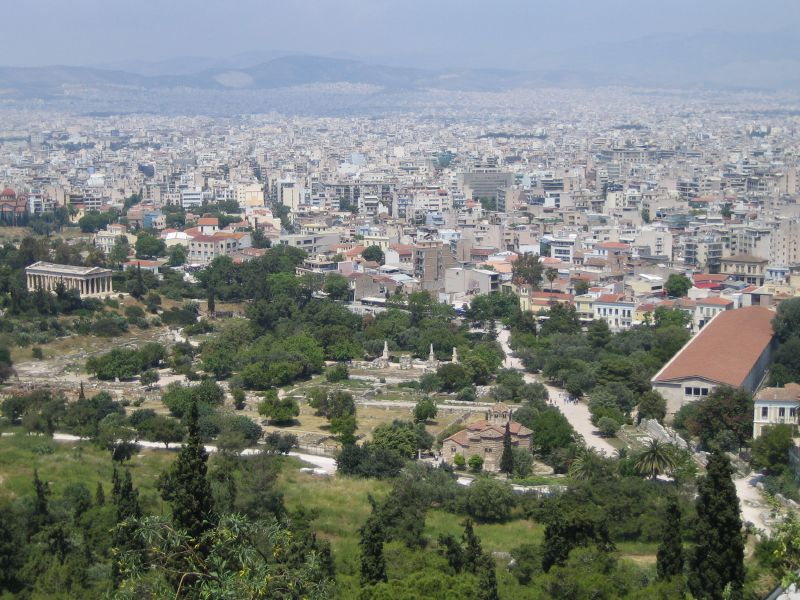
View of the Agora of Athens with the temple of Hephaestus to the left and the Stoa of Attalos to the right

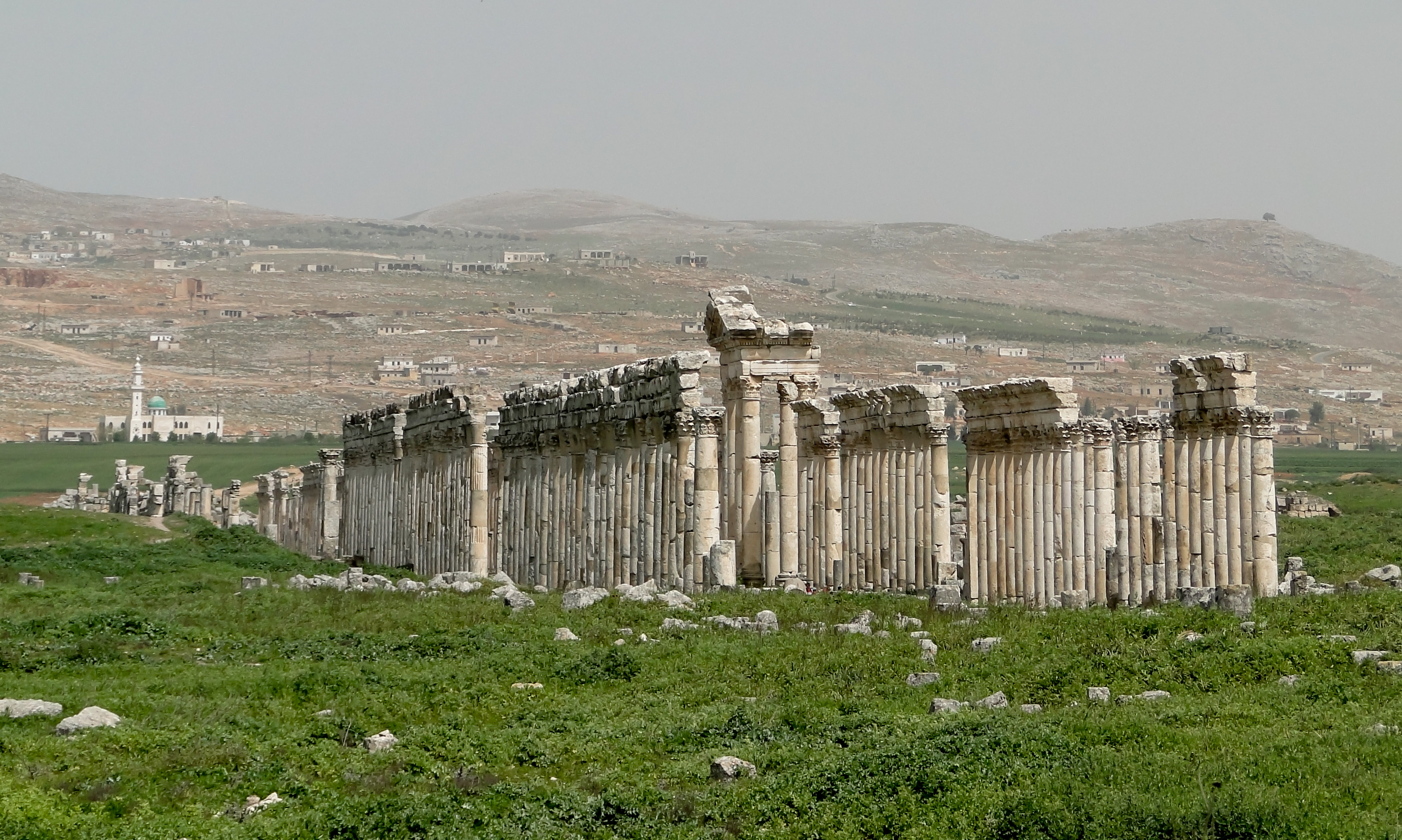
The "Great Colonnade" marks the cardo maximus of Apamea, Syria.

The earliest known proto-cities include Jericho and Çatalhöyük, a settlement in southern Anatolia that existed from approximately 7400 BCE to 5600 BCE whose earlier East Mound may have accommodated a population of 600-800 by 6700 BCE, and possibly several thousands at a later date. Hunting, agriculture and animal domestication all played a role in the society of Çatalhöyük.

Eridu was one of the earliest cities (5400 BCE – 600 BCE), and located in southern modern day Iraq.

Mesopotamia, the area of the Tigris and Euphrates within modern day Iraq and Syria, was home to numerous cities by the third millennium BCE. These cities formed the basis of the Sumerian and subsequent cultures. Cities such as Jericho, Uruk, Ur, Nineveh, and Babylon, made legendary by the Bible, have been located and excavated, while others such as Damascus and Jerusalem have been continuously populated.

The Phoenician trading empire, flourishing around the turn of the first millennium BC, encompassed numerous cities extending from Tyre, Sidon, and Byblos, across the Mediterranean to Carthage (in modern Tunisia) and Cádiz (in modern Spain). The name of Melqart, an important Phoenician deity, comes from M-L-K and Q-R-T, meaning "king" and "city".

Beginning in the early first millennium, independent city-states in Greece began to flourish, evolving the notion of citizenship, becoming in the process the archetype of the free city, the polis. The agora, meaning "gathering place" or "assembly", was the center of athletic, artistic, spiritual and political life of the polis. These Greek city-states reached great levels of prosperity that resulted in an unprecedented cultural boom, that of classical Greece, expressed in architecture, drama, science, mathematics and philosophy, and nurtured in Athens under a democratic government. The Greek Hippodamus of Miletus (c. 407 BCE) has been dubbed the "Father of City Planning" for his design of Miletus; the Hippodamian, or grid plan, was the basis for subsequent Greek and Roman cities. In the 4th century BCE, Alexander the Great commissioned Dinocrates of Rhodes to lay out his new city of Alexandria, the grandest example of idealized urban planning of the ancient Mediterranean world, where the city's regularity was facilitated by its level site near a mouth of the Nile.

The rise of Rome again shifted the locus of political power, resulting in economic and demographic (Note: Keith Hopkins estimates that ancient Rome had a population of about a million people by the end of the 1st century BC, after growing continually during the 3rd, 2nd, and 1st centuries BC, making it the largest city in the world at the time. Alexandria's population was also close to Rome's population at around the same time, the historian Rostovtzeff estimates a total population close to a million based on a census dated from 32 AD that counted 180,000 adult male citizens in Alexandria.) gain for the city of Rome itself, and a new political regime in the form of the Roman Empire. Rome founded many cities (coloniae), characteristically imposing a grid pattern made of north–south cardines and east–west decumani. The intersection of the cardo maximus and the decumanus maximus marked the origin of the city grid. Following these standard plans, Rome founded hundreds of cities and exerted substantial influence toward urbanizing the Mediterranean. In the process, Rome developed sanitation, public housing, public buildings and the forum. In the late Roman Empire political power was increasingly held by bishops of the Christian Church.

=== Asia ===
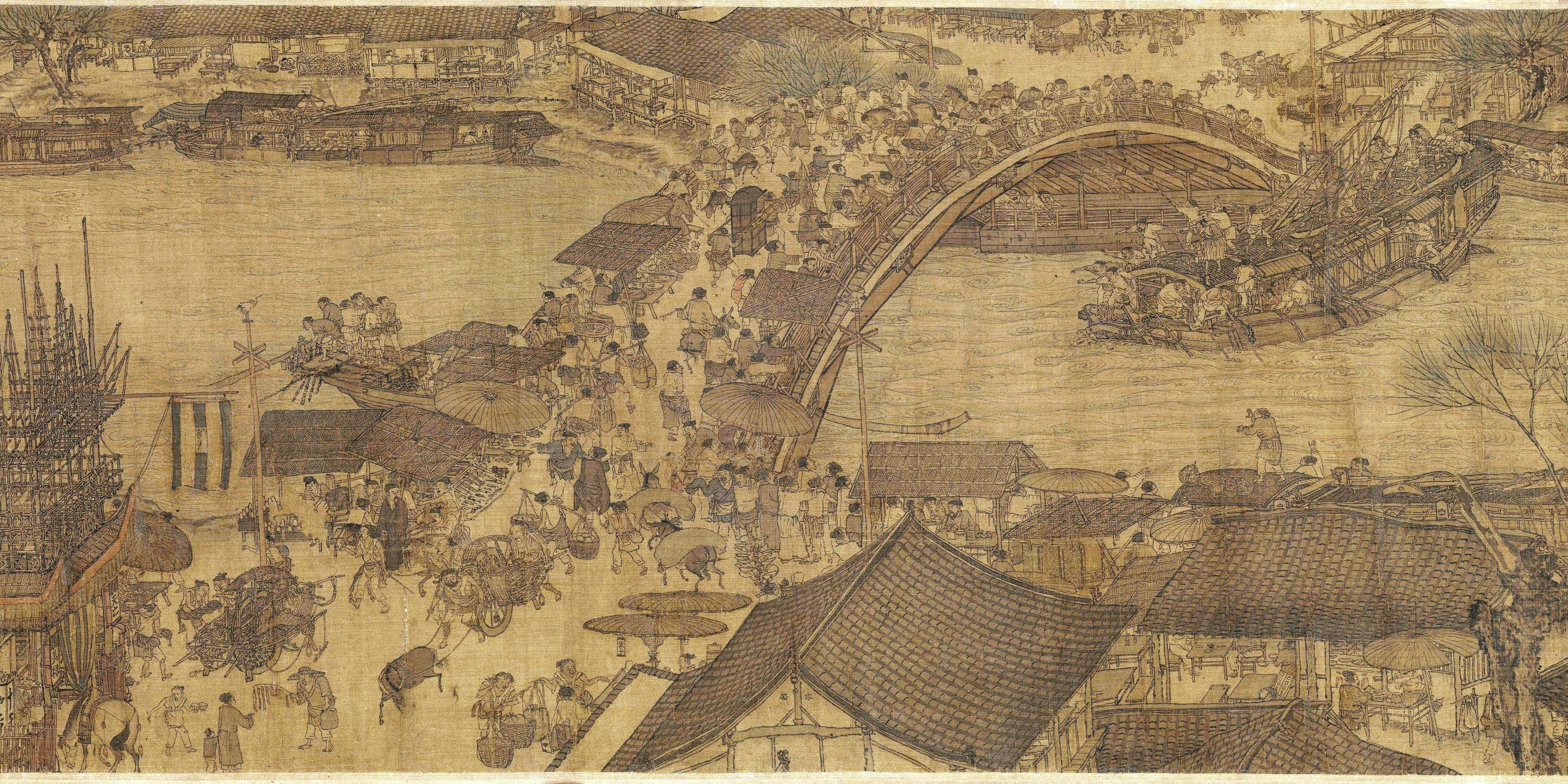
Daily life of people from the Song period at the capital, Bianjing, today's Kaifeng

The Indus Valley Civilization and ancient China are two other areas with major indigenous urban traditions. Among the early Old World cities, Mohenjo-daro of the Indus Valley Civilization in present-day Pakistan, existing from about 2600 BCE, was one of the largest, with a population of 50,000 or more and a sophisticated sanitation system. Additionally, Mehrgarh, an archaeological site dating to circa 7000 BCE can be considered one of the first cities in the world, and the origin of agriculture in South Asia.

China's planned cities date to the turn of the second millennium BCE. City-states emerging at this time used geomancy to locate and plan cities, orienting their walls to cardinal points. Symbolic cities were constructed as celestial microcosms, with the central point corresponding to the pole star representing harmony and connection between the earthly and other realms. In Chang'an the imperial palace lay to the north, facing south, absorbing the light of the sun, and royalty slept with their heads to the north and their feet to the south. Next came the Imperial City, and then the people's city, divided into eastern and western halves.

=== West Africa ===
Agriculture was practiced in West Africa since the third millennium BC. Because of this, cities could develop as centers of non-agricultural activity, well before the influence of Arab urban culture. From 1600 BC, Dhar Tichitt, in the south of present-day Mauritania, presented characteristics suggestive of an incipient form of urbanism. The second place to show urban characteristics in West Africa was Dia, in present-day Mali, from 800 BC. Both Dhar Tichitt and Dia were founded by the same people: the Soninke, who would later also found the Ghana Empire.

Another ancient site, Jenné-Jeno, in what is today Mali, has been dated to the third century BCE. According to Roderick and Susan McIntosh, Jenné-Jeno did not fit into traditional Western conceptions of urbanity as it lacked monumental architecture and a distinctive elite social class, but it should indeed be considered a city based on a functional redefinition of urban development. In particular, Jenné-Jeno featured settlement mounds arranged according to a horizontal, rather than vertical, power hierarchy, and served as a center of specialized production and exhibited functional interdependence with the surrounding hinterland.

More recently, scholars have concluded that the civilization of Djenne-Djenno was likely established by the Mande progenitors of the Bozo people. Their habitation of the site spanned the period from 3rd century BCE to 13th century CE. Archaeological evidence from Jenné-Jeno, specifically the presence of non-West African glass beads dated from the third century BCE to the fourth century CE, indicates that pre-Arabic trade contacts probably existed between Jenné-Jeno and North Africa.

Additionally, other early urban centers in West Africa, dated to around 500 CE, include Awdaghust, Kumbi Saleh, the ancient capital of Ghana, and Maranda, a center located on a trade route between Egypt and Gao.

=== Americas ===
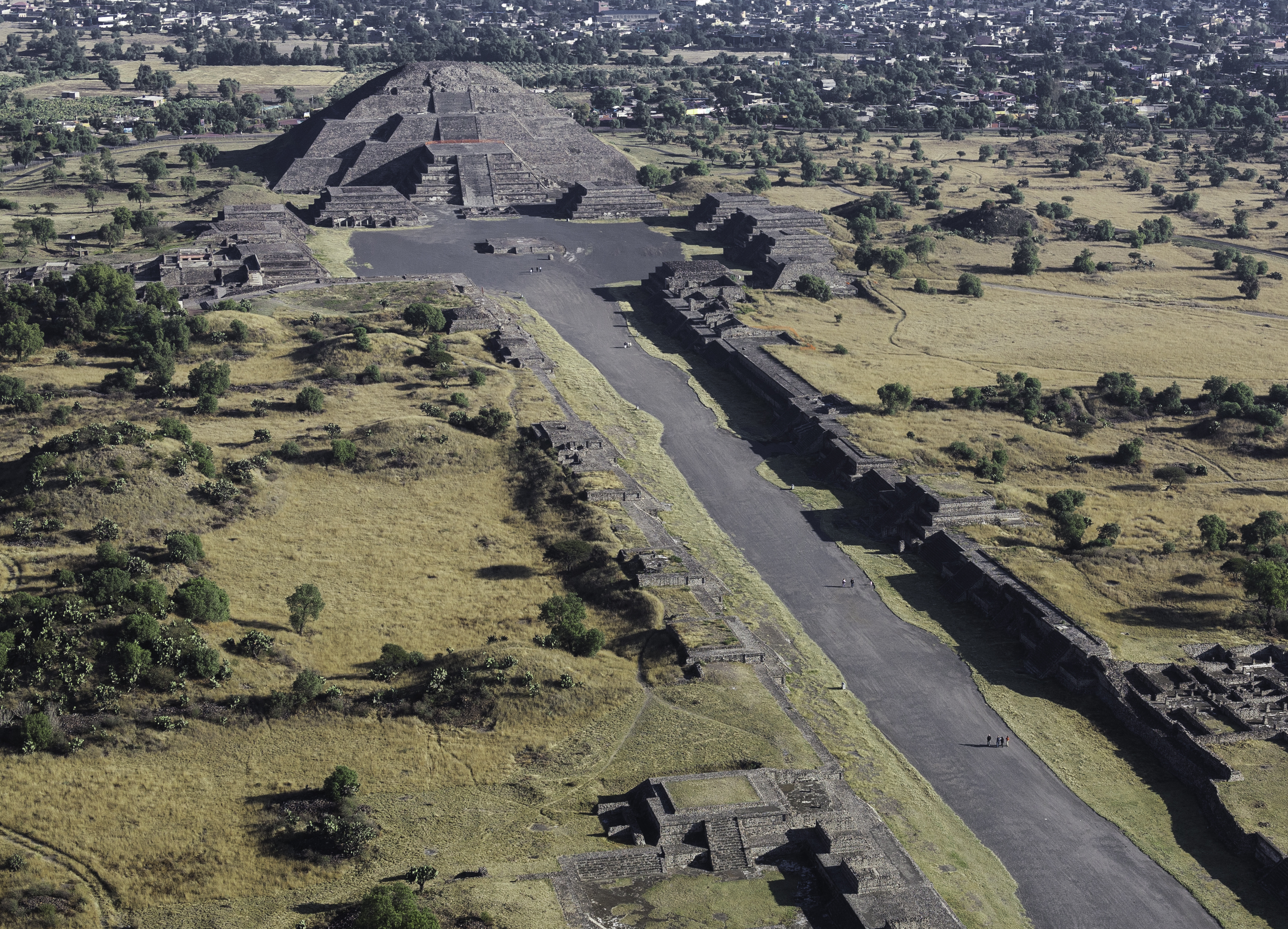
The Avenue of the Dead in Teotihuacan originates with the Pyramid of the Moon, forming the basis of the city grid.

In the ancient Americas, early urban traditions developed in the Andes and Mesoamerica. In the Andes, the first urban centers developed in the Norte Chico civilization (also Caral or Caral-Supe civilization), Chavin and Moche cultures, followed by major cities in the Huari, Chimu and Inca cultures. The Norte Chico civilization included as many as 30 major population centers in what is now the Norte Chico region of north-central coastal Peru. It is the oldest known civilization in the Americas, flourishing between the 30th century BCE and the 18th century BCE. Mesoamerica saw the rise of early urbanism in several cultural regions, including the Preclassic Maya, the Zapotec of Oaxaca, and Teotihuacan in central Mexico. Later cultures such as the Aztec drew on these earlier urban traditions.

Teotihuacan, flourishing from 200 BCE to 750 CE, was the largest American city of the pre-Columbian era, possibly reaching a population of 125,000 in 200 CE. The city's grid plan originated with the "Avenue of the Dead", connecting the Temple of the Feathered Serpent and the Pyramid of the Moon. Beyond its ceremonial center the city featured religious buildings (23 temple complexes) and myriad workshops. Although its religious system was clearly expansive and significant, details of its political and economic functioning remain matters of speculation.

== Middle Ages ==
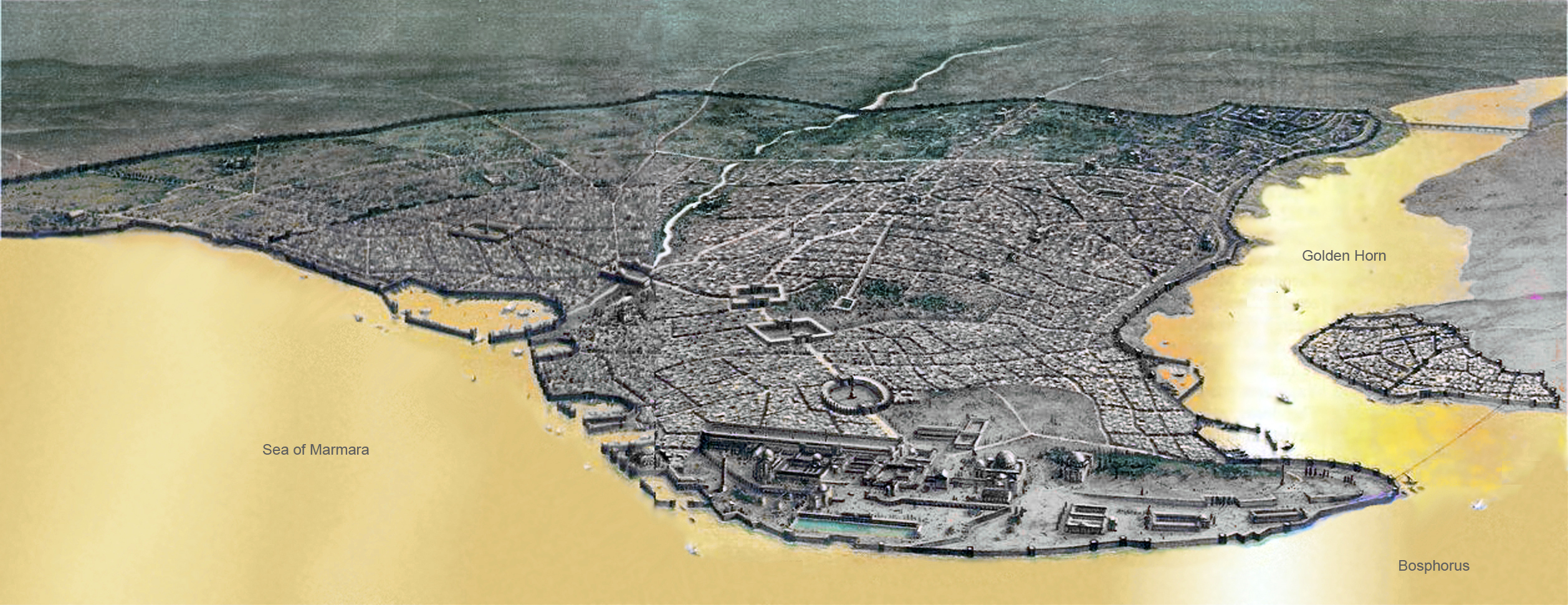
Constantinople, the largest and wealthiest city in Europe from the 9th through the 12th century

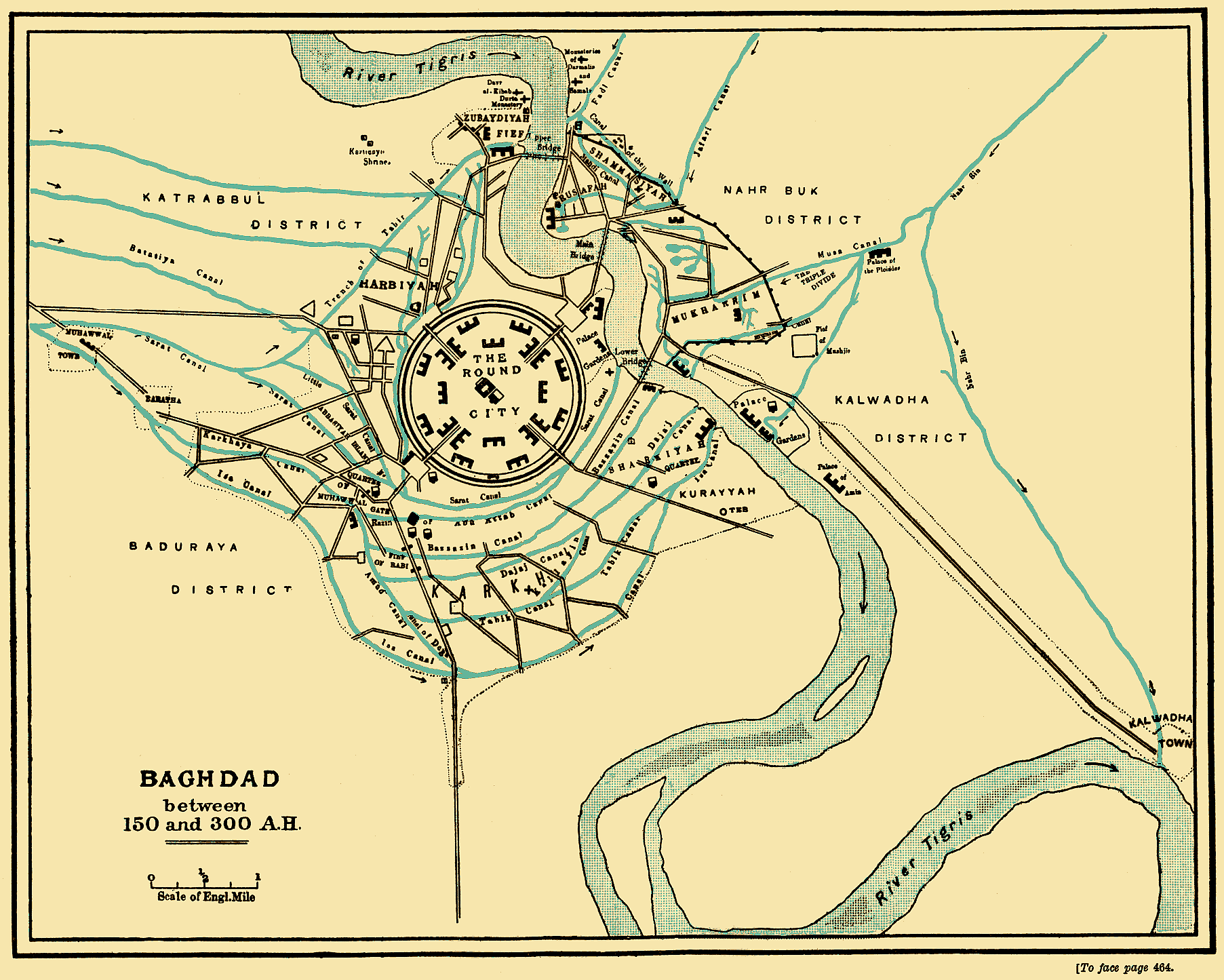
The Round city of Baghdad, the capital of Iraq

In the remnants of the Roman Empire, cities of late antiquity at first gained independence, but lost their population and their importance, starting in Roman Britain and Germania. The locus of wealth in the West shifted to Constantinople and to the ascendant Islamic civilization with its major cities Baghdad, (Note: George Modelski considers medieval Baghdad, with an estimated population of 1.2 million at its peak, the largest city before 19th century London and the first with a population of over one million. Others estimate that Baghdad's population may have been as large as 2 million in the 9th century.) Cairo, and Córdoba.

From the 9th through the end of the 12th century, Constantinople, capital of the Byzantine Empire, was the largest and wealthiest city in Europe, with a population approaching 1 million. Following the Byzantine–Ottoman wars and other conflicts, the Ottoman Empire gained control over many cities in the Mediterranean area, including Constantinople in 1453.

During the European Middle Ages, a town was as much a political entity as a collection of houses. City residence brought freedom from customary rural obligations to lord and community: "Stadtluft macht frei" ("City air makes you free") was a saying in Germany. In Continental Europe cities with a legislature of their own were not unheard of, the laws for towns as a rule other than for the countryside, the lord of a town often being another than for surrounding land. In the Holy Roman Empire, some cities had no other lord than the emperor. Some planned towns were created, in Britain by King Edward I to colonize Wales and in France, bastides, fortified cities designed on a regular plan.

By the thirteenth and fourteenth centuries some cities become powerful states, taking surrounding areas under their control or establishing extensive maritime empires. In Italy medieval communes developed into city-states including the Republic of Venice and the Republic of Genoa. These cities, with populations in the tens of thousands, amassed enormous wealth by means of extensive trade in eastern luxury goods such as spices and silk, as well as iron, timber, and slaves. Venice introduced the ghetto, a specially regulated neighborhood for Jews only. In Northern Europe, cities including Lübeck and Bruges formed the Hanseatic League for collective defense and commerce. Their power was later challenged and eclipsed by the Dutch commercial cities of Ghent, Ypres, and Amsterdam. (City rights were granted by nobility.) The city's central function was commerce, enabled by waterways and ports; the cities themselves were heavily fortified with walls and sometimes moats.

Similar phenomena existed elsewhere, as in the case of Sakai, which enjoyed a considerable autonomy in late medieval Japan.

In the first millennium CE, an urban tradition developed in the Khmer region of Cambodia, where Angkor grew into one of the largest cities (in area) of the world. The closest rival to Angkor, the Mayan city of Tikal in Guatemala, was between 100 and 150 square kilometres (39 and 58 sq mi) in total size. Although its population remains a topic of research and debate, newly identified agricultural systems in the Angkor area may have supported up to one million people.

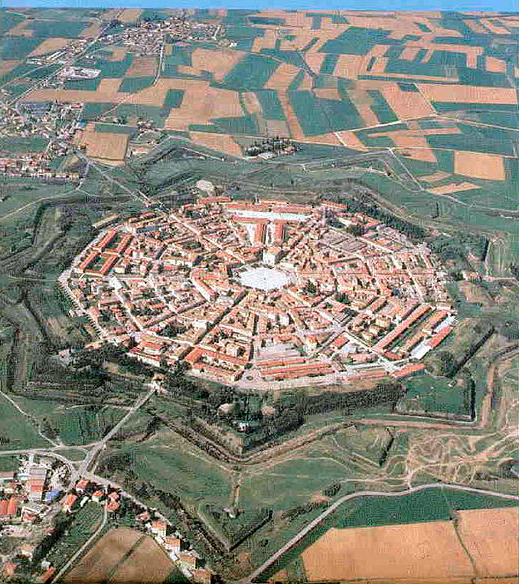
Palmanova, Italy, constructed in 1593 according to the defensive ideal of the star fort, today retains its distinctive geometry.

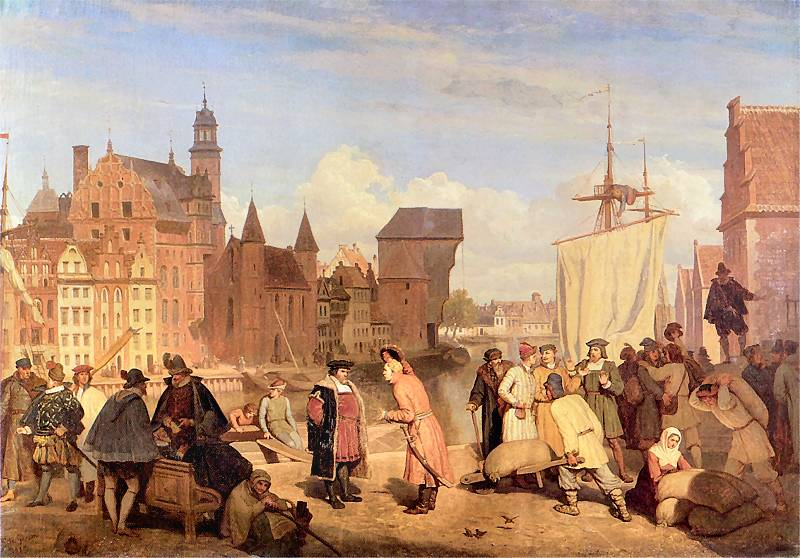
Gdańsk in the 17th century

While the city-states, or poleis, of the Mediterranean and Baltic Sea languished from the 16th century, Western Europe's larger capitals grew again as commercial hubs, especially following the emergence of an Atlantic trade. By the early 19th century, London had become the largest city in the world with a population of over a million, while Paris rivaled the well-developed regionally traditional capital cities of Baghdad, Beijing, Istanbul and Kyoto. Bastion forts arose in an attempt to make cities defensible against strengthening military firepower.

The Aztec city of Tenochtitlan, in present-day Mexico, had an estimated population between 200,000 and 300,000 when the Spanish conquistador Hernán Cortés arrived in 1519. During the Spanish colonization of the Americas the old Roman city concept was extensively used. Cities were founded in the middle of the newly conquered territories, and were bound to several laws about administration, finances and urbanism.

West Africa already had cities before the Common Era, but the consolidation of Trans-Saharan trade in the Middle Ages multiplied the number of cities in the region, as well as making some of them very populous, notably Gao (72,000 inhabitants in 800 AD), Oyo-Ile (50,000 inhabitants in 1400 AD, and may have reached up to 140,000 inhabitants in the 18th century), Ile-Ifẹ̀ (70,000 to 105,000 inhabitants in the 14th and 15th centuries), Niani (50,000 inhabitants in 1400 AD) and Timbuktu (100,000 inhabitants in 1450 AD).

Most towns remained small, so that in 1500 only some two dozen places in the world contained more than 100,000 inhabitants. As late as 1700, there were fewer than forty, a figure that rose to 300 in 1900.

== Industrial Revolution ==
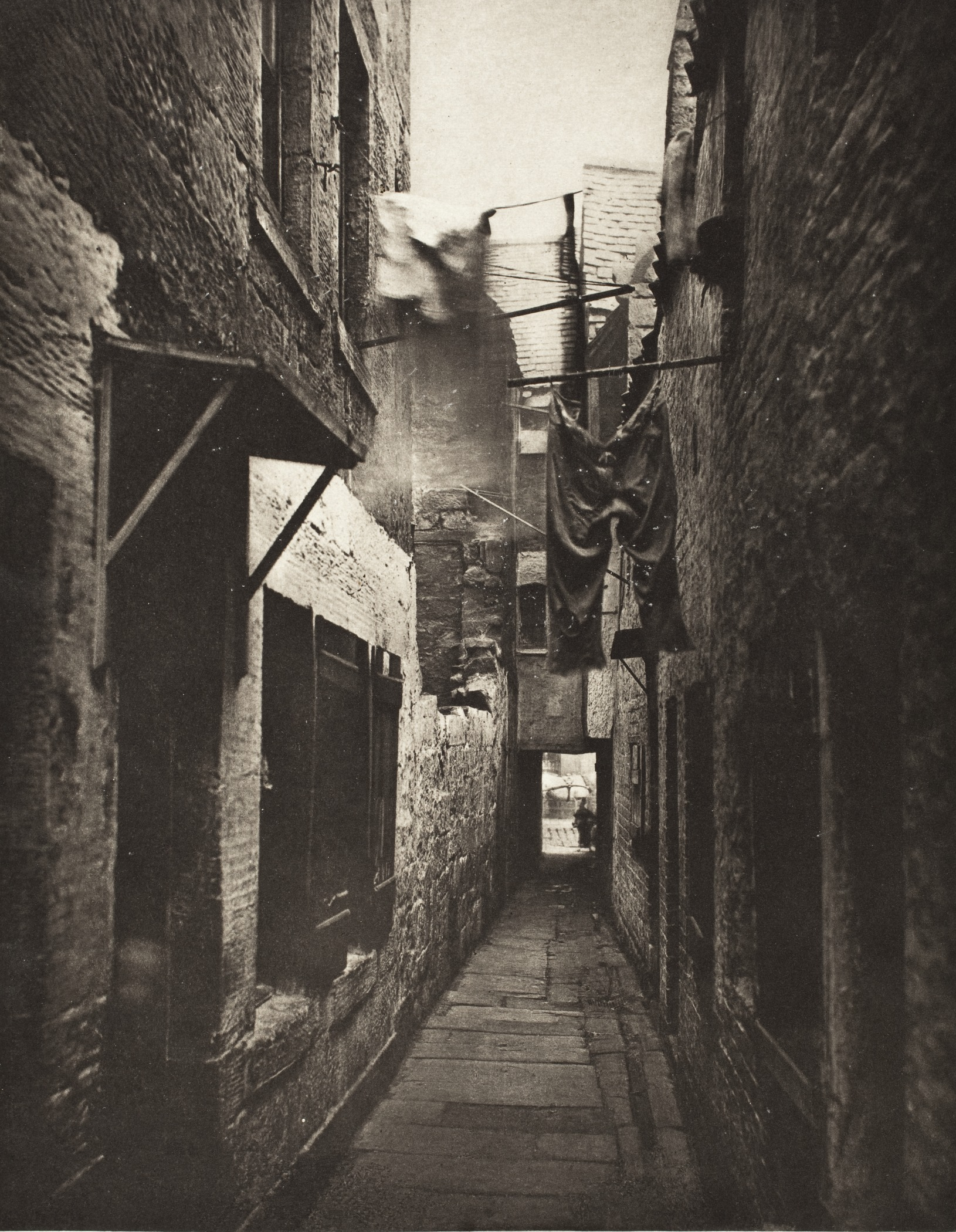
Glasgow slum in 1871

The growth of modern industry from the late 18th century onward led to massive urbanization and the rise of new great cities, first in Europe and then in other regions, as new opportunities brought huge numbers of migrants from rural communities into urban areas. England led the way as London became the capital of a world empire and cities across the country grew in locations strategic for manufacturing. In the United States from 1860 to 1910, the introduction of railroads reduced transportation costs, and large manufacturing centers began to emerge, fueling migration from rural to city areas.

Industrialized cities became deadly places to live, due to health problems resulting from overcrowding, occupational hazards of industry, contaminated water and air, poor sanitation, and communicable diseases such as typhoid and cholera. Factories and slums emerged as regular features of the urban landscape.

=== Infrastructure ===
The 19th century saw the rise of public transportation, such as horse-drawn omnibuses, followed by horse trams. At the end of the 19th century, electric urban rail transport (including trams and rapid transit) began to replace them, later completed with buses and other motor vehicles.

Street lights were uncommon until gas lighting became widespread in Europe in the early 19th century. Fuel gas was also used for heating and cooking. From the 1880s, electrification began, making electricity the main energy medium in cities until present day.

Modern water supply networks began to expand during the 19th century.

== 20th century ==
Growth of cities continued through the twentieth century and increased dramatically in the Third World (including India, China, and Africa), due to industrialization, active promotion of urbanization, and other factors.

Urban planning became widespread and professionalized. At the turn of the century, the "garden city" model became the icon of a self-contained, comprehensively designed, residential and commercial settlement. Professional urban planners appeared in large numbers, not only to design cities, but to provide technical expertise to their administration.

Cities in the great depression of the 1930s, especially those with a base in heavy industry, were hard hit by unemployment. In the U.S. urbanization rate increased forty to eighty percent during 1900–1990. Today the world's population is slightly over half urban, and continues to urbanize, with roughly a million people moving into cities every 24 hours worldwide.

During the 20th century, car ownership has increased steadily, parallel with suburban sprawl, highways and other development for the car. Awareness of ecology in the mid-20th century created the environmental movement, which has addressed the need for sustainable development.

In the second half of the twentieth century, deindustrialization (or "economic restructuring") in the West led to poverty, homelessness, and urban decay in formerly prosperous cities. America's "Steel Belt" became a "Rust Belt" and cities such as Detroit, Michigan, and Gary, Indiana began to shrink, contrary to the global trend of massive urban expansion. Under the Great Leap Forward and subsequent five-year plans continuing today, the People's Republic of China has undergone concomitant urbanization and industrialization to become the world's leading manufacturer.

== 21st century ==
There is a debate about whether technology and instantaneous communications are making cities obsolete, or reinforcing the importance of big cities as centres of the knowledge economy. Knowledge-based development of cities, globalization of innovation networks, and broadband services are driving forces of a new city planning paradigm towards smart cities that use technology and communication to create more efficient agglomerations in terms of competitiveness, innovation, environment, energy, utilities, governance, and delivery of services to the citizen. Some companies are building brand new masterplanned cities from scratch on greenfield sites.

- Gujarat International Finance Tec-City, India
- Nano City, India
- Putrajaya, Malaysia
- Bonifacio Global City, Philippines
- King Abdullah Economic City, Saudi Arabia
- Sejong City, South Korea
- Songdo International Business District, South Korea
- Dubai Waterfront, United Arab Emirates
- Dubai World Central, United Arab Emirates
- Masdar City, United Arab Emirates

== See also ==
- History of water supply and sanitation
- List of oldest continuously inhabited cities
