= Nicarao people =

Nahua ethnic group of Nicaragua

Nahua
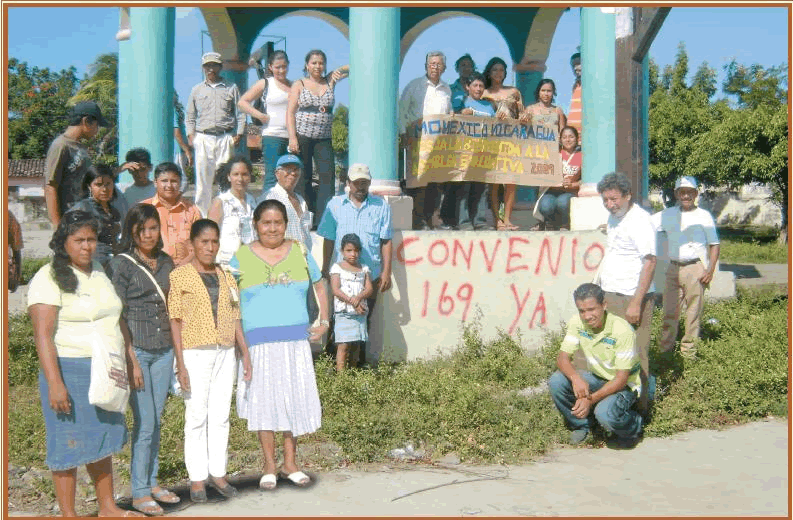
- Nahua community in Rivas, Nicaragua Nahua community in Rivas, Nicaragua.

Total population
- 20,000, 400,000 (1523)

Regions with significant populations
- Western Nicaragua
- Nicaragua: 20,000

Languages
- Nawat, Spanish

Religion
- Predominantly Roman Catholic

Related ethnic groups
- Nahuas, Toltecs, Pipil people, Mexica, Maya peoples, Chorotega, Aztecs

The Nicarao are an Indigenous Nahua people living in western Nicaragua and northwestern Costa Rica. They are the southernmost Nahua group located in southern Mesoamerica. They spoke the Nahuat language before it became endangered after the Spanish conquest of Nicaragua and Costa Rica.

The Nicarao are a subgroup of the Pipil people, both of which are descended from the Toltecs, who migrated from Aridoamerica over the course of several centuries starting about 700 CE, the late Mesoamerican Classic period. This branch of the Nahua people originated in Chiapas, which was inhabited by Nawat-speaking Toltecs for hundreds of years before they migrated further into Central America.

Around 1200 CE, a group of Pipils that would eventually become the Nicarao migrated further south and settled in the Greater Nicoya region of Nicaragua and Costa Rica, seized most of the fertile lands in the region, and eventually separated and formed their own chiefdoms. The migration of the Nicarao has been linked to the collapse of the important central Mexican cities of Teotihuacan and Tula, as well as the Classic Maya collapse. The Nicarao settled throughout western Nicaragua, inhabiting Rivas, Jinotega, Chinandega, Nueva Segovia, Masaya, Carazo, Madriz, Matagalpa, Esteli, Leon, Granada and Managua. In addition the Nicarao controlled Tiger Lagoon, Lake Managua, Lake Cocibolca, and the islands of Ometepe and Zapatera in Lake Nicaragua. Both Ometepe and Zapatera were sacred to the Nicarao.

The Nicarao also settled in Bagaces, Costa Rica after displacing the Huetar people, Chibchan speakers already living in the region, resulting in conflict between Nahuas and Huetares that lasted until Spanish arrival.

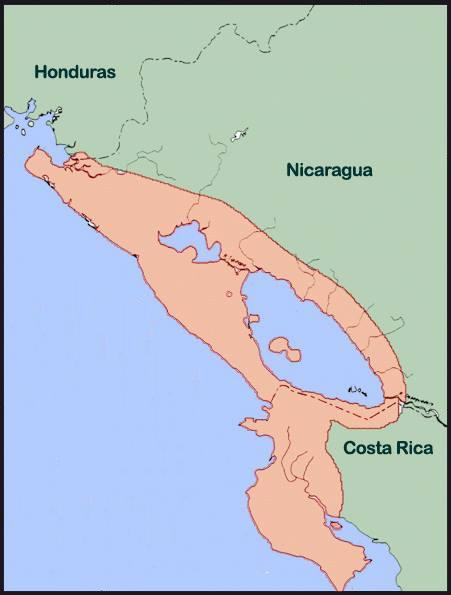
Location of Nicanahuac, the Indigenous name for western Nicaragua and northwestern Costa Rica given by the Nahuas who inhabited the region.

The Nicarao referred to western Nicaragua as Nicānāhuac, which means "here lies Anahuac" in Nahuat and is a combination of the words Nican (here), and Ānāhuac, which in turn is a combination of the words atl "water" and nahuac, a locative meaning "surrounded". Therefore, the literal translation of Nicanahuac is "here surrounded by water". This was a geographical endonym that referred to the large bodies of water that surrounded the land the Nicarao inhabited: the Pacific Ocean, lakes Nicaragua and Xolotlan, and the many rivers and lagoons. Similarly, the Aztec city of Tenochtitlan was also surrounded by water, which they referred to as Cemanahuac. This establishes a linguistic, ethnic, and cultural connection between pre-Columbian Mexico and Nicaragua.

As a Mesoamerican people, the Nicarao shared many blended cultural traits with other Indigenous belief systems and maintained the Toltec version of the Mesoamerican calendar, similar pottery and effigies, similar organizational treaties, the use of screenfold books, the worship of a high god and closely-related sky gods, nagual mysticism, the practice of animal and tonal spirituality, and expertise in medical practice.

== History ==
According to tradition, the Nicaraos migrated from their ancestral homeland, which they referred to as Nahuatlan, meaning "land of Nahuas" or "place of intelligible speech". After Nahuatlan collapsed, they were commanded by Tloquenahuaque to travel south until they found a lake with two volcanoes rising out of the water. After the Nicarao split from the Pipils and migrated further south, they stopped when they reached Lake Nicaragua, the largest lake in Central America, which contains two volcanoes on Ometepe.

After the Nicarao arrived into what is now western Nicaragua and northwestern Costa Rica, they seized most of the fertile lands in the area through warfare, and displaced many neighboring peoples, most of which were cultures belonging to the Isthmo-Colombian Area, including the Cacaoperas, and Huetares, but also Mesoamerican peoples, including the Chorotegas, who are Otomanguean. The Nahua chiefdoms of Kwawkapolkan and Kakawatan sent their armies as far north as Carazo during their wars against the Chorotegas, and as far south as the Nicoya Peninsula and southern Guanacaste during their military campaigns against the Kingdom of Nicoya and the Huetares.

Furthermore, the chiefdom of Tekwantepek invaded Matagalpa and Boaco to pillage, enslave, and displace the Cacaoperas and Mayangnas from their lands. Tekwantepek also performed human sacrifice on Cacaopera and Mayangna prisoners of war in addition to selling their women as slaves and prostitutes for 100 cacao beans and five cacao beans, respectively.

Although the Nicarao displaced rival peoples through warfare, they also developed trade relations with smaller peoples, maintaining hegemony over western Nicaragua through military superiority, cultural dominance, their large population, and commerce. Despite their lack of political unity, the armies of the Nicarao chiefdoms shared a warrior tradition and shared a pattern of standard military equipment. Nicarao warriors were equipped with long and thick padded cotton armor that extended down to their thighs and knees, protective headgear, medium to large shields, spears, atlatls, bow and arrows, clubs edged with stone blades, knives and daggers with obsidian blades, and macanas, a wooden sword edged with obsidian blades similar to the Aztec macuahuitl. Furthermore, Nicarao troops were rationed cacao, which could be added to water, a policy providing extra sustainability. Cacao water kept warriors vigilant, focused, and energetic due to its caffeine content, which gave them an advantage in battle.

In addition, non-Nahua minorities lived and thrived within several Nahua chiefdoms alongside the Nahua majority, such as the Chibchan-speaking minorities in Kwawkapolkan and Kakawatan, and the Chibcha and Otomanguean-speaking minorities in Masatepek. The military forces of Kwawkapolkan and Kakawatan were also unifying entities under a somewhat diverse population of Nahuas and Chibchas. Military service provided social advancement and assimilation, which resulted in Chibchan troops serving alongside their Nahua counterparts in the chiefdoms armed forces to further integrate into Nahua society. The Nicarao cultivation of potatoes also suggests cultural diffusion from the Chibchans, as the latter introduced potatoes from South America. Furthermore, many Chibchan peoples across the Intermediate Area were heavily influenced by the Nicaraos, such as their adoption of the Nahua pantheon, and their ability to speak Nawat, which was documented by Conquistadores. This shows that despite being divided into multiple polities and being surrounded by peoples of the Isthmo-Colombian Area, the Nicarao shared great cultural, economic, religious, and political influence across southern Mesoamerica and the Isthmo-Colombian regions.

In 1501, after Ahuitzotl, tlahtoāni of Tenochtitlan, sent pochtecas to explore and establish relations with other peoples of Central America, trade relations developed between the Mexica and the Nicarao. Commercial exchange between Tenochtitlan and the chiefdoms of Nicanahuac continued to flourish after Moctezuma II ascended to the throne of Tenochtitlan as Mexica merchants traded and thrived within Nicarao territory.

== Language and etymology ==
Although they are Nahuas, they're erroneously known by the exonym "Nicarao", which was not what the Nahuas of Nicaragua called themselves as it was a term imposed on them by the conquistadors, in addition to the fact that the letter "r" does not exist in the Nawat language. They are sometimes referred to as Nicanahuacanos (people of Nicanahuac) by Nicaraguan historians. The etymology of the term "Nicarao" most likely originated as a shortened and hispanicized form of "Nicānāhuac", the name used by the Nicaraos to refer to western Nicaragua. This is evident in the Spaniards use of the root Nica in "Nicarao" which derives from Nahuatl Nican.

Out of all the Central American dialects of Nawat, the dialect spoken by the Nicarao was found to be the most similar to central-Mexican Nahuatl. Furthermore, both Salvadoran and Nicaraguan Nawat were found to be closely related to Nawat from Chiapas. It is also evident that the Nicarao were able to understand Nahuatl, as the Spaniards were able to communicate with Nicaraos they encountered in Nahuatl through their Tlaxcallan translators. Nahuatl was used as a lingua franca at that time because many Indigenous groups in Mesoamerica could speak Nahuatl. This culminated an environment where different Indigenous groups with unintelligible languages could communicate with each other.

The Nawat language went extinct in Nicaragua in the late 1800s, and was last spoken on Ometepe Island and in the departments of Rivas and Masaya.

== Chiefdoms and political organization ==
Nicarao society was subdivided into social classes of nobles, commoners, slaves, and war captives. Nicarao government structures consisted of caciques (teyte or calachuni), councils (nonexico) of elders (guegue), and captains general who were local rulers subordinate to the cacique, responsible for collecting tribute and enforcing the orders of the cacique. There were military captains called tapaligue.

According to Spanish conquistadors Gil González Dávila and Gonzalo Fernández de Oviedo y Valdés, who was also a historian, the Nicarao had multiple chiefdoms that were independent from one another. In addition, although these chiefdoms shared the same language, culture, and ethnicity, they were never unified under a single political entity as Kuskatan was in present-day El Salvador.

- Kwawkapolkan
- Kakawatan
- Masatepek
- Tekwantepek
- Shilutepek
- Teswatan
- Chinantan

The most powerful Nahua chiefdom was Kwawkapolkan, which means "place of capulín trees" in Nawat and was ruled by Macuilmiquiztli. It is a combination of the Nawat words Kwawit (tree), kapolin (capulín), and -kan (a locative meaning "place of"). Kwawkapolkan was also the southernmost Nahua chiefdom that extended from Rivas down to Bagaces in central Guanacaste in Costa Rica. Kwawkapolkan bordered its ally Kakawatan in Rivas, the Kingdom of Nicoya which was a powerful Mesoamerican civilization in the Nicoya Peninsula, and smaller Chibcha peoples in other parts of Rivas as well as the Huetares and Voto people of northern Costa Rica.

Kakawatan was another Nahua chiefdom located in what is now the Rivas department of southwestern Nicaragua. The Nahuas of Kakawatan were known as kakawatecos, meaning "people of Kakawatan", and in Nawat as kakawatekat. The chief of Kakawatan was Wemak, who according to several sources, was Macuilmiquiztli's cousin. This could explain the close relations between Kwawkapolkan and Kakawatan. Wemak also had a warrior son named Eskuat, though he wasn't mentioned by Spanish sources again. Before and during spanish contact, Kakawatan and Kwawkapolkan had a military alliance and were in a constant state of war with the Chorotegas, the Kingdom of Nicoya, and later fought together against the Spanish. The name Kakawatan is a combination of the Nawat words kakaw (Cacao), at (water), and -tan (locative suffix meaning land/place of). Therefore, Kakawatan translates to "land of cacao water", referring to chocolate drinks, one the most important aspects of Nicarao culture. This tradition is still practiced in the communities of Rivas among the descendants of the Nahuas both Indigenous and mestizos alike.

Masatepek was located in what is now Masaya in western Nicaragua, and was in close proximity to the chiefdoms of Shilutepek and Tekwantepek. The Nahuas of Masatepek coexisted with the Otomangueans who also inhabited the area. The name Masatepek is a combination of the Nawat words Masat (deer), and -tepek (hill). The literal translation of Masatepek is "deer hill". The Nahuas of Masatepek inhabited Nindiri, Niquinohomo, Monimbó, and Masatepe which is named after this chiefdom.

Tekwantepek was a militarily strong chiefdom located in present-day Managua, and was one of the last chiefdoms to fall to the conquistadors and their central-Mexican allies. Tekwantepek had continuous wars against the Cacaoperas, and sent their army to Matagalpa and Boaco to pillage, enslave, and displace the Cacaoperas and Mayangnas. Tekwantepek also performed human sacrifice on Cacaopera and Mayangna POWs in addition to selling their women as slaves and prostitutes for 100 cacao beans, and 5 cacao beans. The etymology is a combination of the Nawat words tēkwani (jaguar), and tepek (hill), which translates to "jaguar hill" or "hill of jaguars". The city of Ticuantepe in Managua is likely named after this chiefdom.

Shilutepek was located in what is now Carazo of pacific Nicaragua, and was in close proximity to Masatepek, and Tekwantepek. The Nahuas of Shilutepek fought against the Chorotegas who also inhabited much of the land now part of the Carazo department. The etymology of Shilutepek comes the Nawat words Shilut (tender maize), and -tepek (hill), meaning "hill of tender maize". The city of Jinotepe is named after this chiefdom.

Teswatan was located in northwestern Nicaragua, specifically Chinandega. Teswatan means "Place of Tezhuate". Fernandez de Oviedo described Teswatan as a chiefdom filled with maize, in addition to Akatekwtli's son ascending to the throne after his death during Spanish conquest.

Chinantan was the northernmost Nicarao chiefdom that bordered the Lencas of southwestern Honduras, the pre-Columbian relations between the Lencas and the Nicaraos are unknown. Chinantan was located in Chinandega and had close relations with Teswatlan. Chinantan means "place surrounded by reeds" in Nahuatl. A Nicarao from Chinantan was called a Chinantekat meaning "person from Chinantán".

== Spanish conquest ==
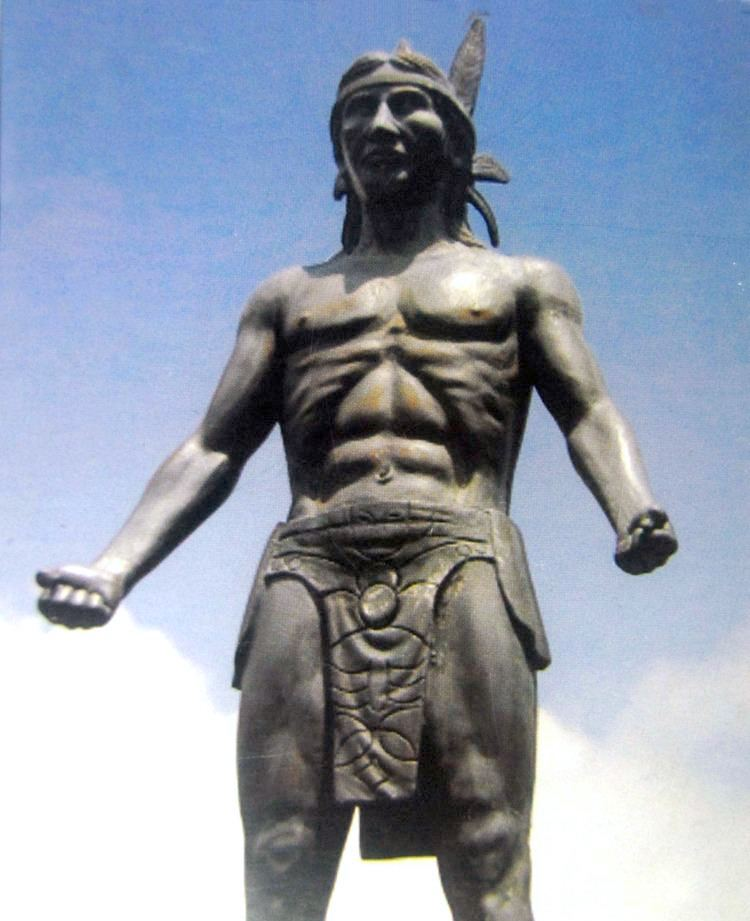
Monument to Macuilmiquiztli, Nahua chief of Kwawkapolkan

At the time of Spanish arrival, Gil González Dávila traveled to western Nicaragua with a small army of just over 100 men made up of conquistadors and their Tlaxcalteca allies. They explored the fertile western valleys and were impressed with the Nahua and Oto-manguean civilizations for the vast amounts of food they had in addition to their flourishing markets, permanent temples, and trade network. Despite the good first impression however, Dávila referred to the Nahuas and Chorotegas as los rojos ("the reds" in Spanish), and their children as rojitos ("little red kids" in Spanish) which were derogatory terms based on skin color.

Eventually, Dávila met with the most powerful ruler in pre-Columbian Nicaragua named Macuilmiquiztli, meaning "Five Deaths" in the Nahuatl language, and conversed with him through Tlaxcalan translators. This contact took place in Carazo, where Macuilmiquiztli lead his army in a military campaign against the Chorotegas led by Diriangén. Due to the sudden nature of Spanish contact in addition to the natives curiosity, the war between the Nahuas and Chorotegas came to a halt. Despite meeting Dávila in Carazo, Macuilmiquiztli governed the Nahua chiefdom of Kwawkapolkan, not far from the modern town of Rivas. Macuilmiquiztli initially welcomed the Spanish and their Tlaxcalteca allies, however, Dávila and his army used the opportunity to gather gold and baptize some of the Nahuas along the way, much to Macuilmiquiztli's disapproval. When Dávila demanded the now skeptical Macuilmiquiztli, as well as chiefs Wemak and Diriangén who were also present, to be baptized, to renounce their pagan beliefs, to hand over the rest of their gold and jewellery, and to bend the knee to the Spanish crown, they refused. Realizing the threat that the Spanish imposed, Macuilmiquiztli, as well as Diriangén, waged war against the Spanish and Tlaxcaltecas which culminated in the Battle of Diriangén, where Nahua and Chorotega warriors together forced Dávila and his men to retreat to Panama.

This set the stage for the Spanish conquest of Nicaragua in 1524 CE, when Nicaragua was invaded on all sides by several Spanish forces, each led by a conquistador. González Dávila was authorized by royal decree to invade from the Caribbean coast of Honduras. Francisco Hernández de Córdoba at the command of the governor of Panama invaded from Costa Rica. Pedro de Alvarado at the command of Hernán Cortés, came from Guatemala through San Salvador and Honduras. By 1525 all of the Nahua chiefdoms in western Nicaragua had fallen to the Spanish.

Ultimately the conquest of Nicanahuac was swift due to the political divisions within Nicarao society, in stark contrast to their Pipil kin who were unified under the Kuskatan confederation, and as a result, lasted much longer against the conquistadors which fell in 1528. After Spanish conquest, Nahua society in western Nicaragua came to a tragic end. The Nicarao suffered a devastating demographic and societal collapse from a combination of disease, war against the Spanish and their Tlaxcalteca allies, and being sold into slavery. The remaining Nahuas were subjected to Spanish rule, forcibly baptized to Catholicism, and were hispanicized both culturally and through intermarriage with Spaniards.

== Nahua-Chorotega alliance ==
Despite the enmity between the Nahuas and Chorotegas, Macuilmiquiztli and Diriangén made peace and agreed to team up against the Spanish and Tlaxcaltecas. This formed a triumvirate-style alliance between chiefs Macuilmiquiztli, Diriangén, and Wemak, all of whom fought together against the invaders with the military forces of their chiefdoms.

Francisco Hernández de Córdoba fought directly against the alliance, and by 1525 the alliance had completely collapsed. Diriangén escaped the Spanish onslaught and eventually died between 1527-1529, Wemak was captured and executed in 1525 after the last of his Kakawateca forces were annihilated by the conquistadors and Tlaxcaltecas, and the fall of Kwawkapolkan in 1525 finalized their defeat.

Macuilmiquiztli and Diriangén remain popular figures in Nicaraguan nationalism and anti-imperialism, and are symbols of Indigenous resistance. In addition, the National Assembly of Nicaragua declared the two Indigenous leaders as national heroes.

== Origin and distribution ==
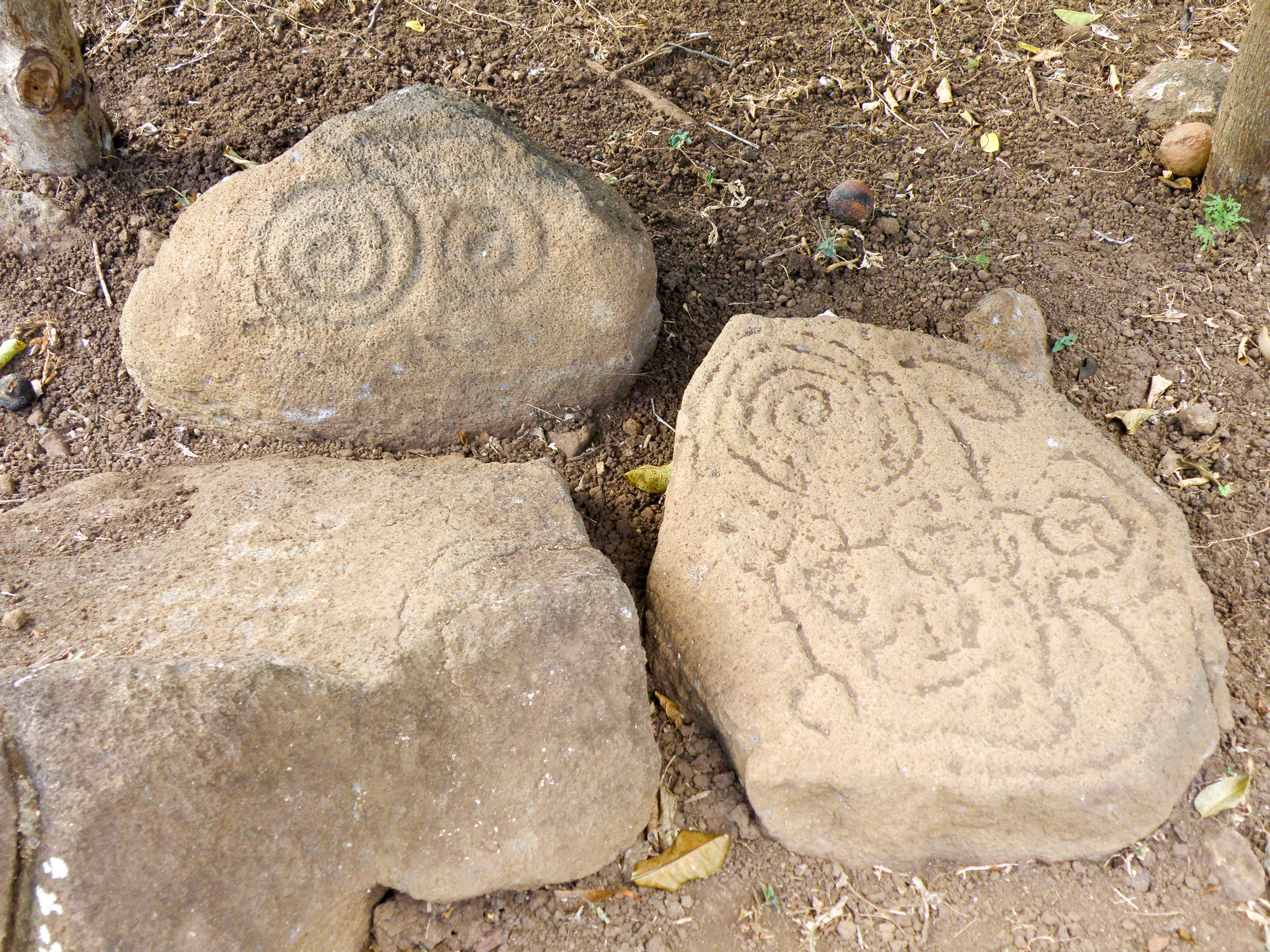
Spiral petroglyphs found at ancient Nicarao settlements on Ometepe Island, Nicaragua.

The Nicarao people migrated south from North America and central and southern Mexico over the course of several centuries from approximately 700 CE onwards. Around 1200 CE, the Nicarao split from the Pipil people and moved into what is now Nicaragua. The beginning of this series of migrations was likely to have been linked to the collapse of the great central-Mexican city of Teotihuacan, and later with the collapse of the Toltec city of Tula. The dating of Nicarao arrival in what is now Nicaragua has also been linked to the Classic Maya collapse, with the cessation of Maya influence in the region, and the rise of cultural traits originating in the Valley of Mexico. The Nicarao had a sizeable population concentrated in nucleated villages all over western Nicaragua and what is now northwestern Costa Rica. They displaced both the Chorotega and the Cacaopera that had previously settled the region; evidence shows some of their culture was integrated into their own. The Nicarao appear to have seized control of the most productive land around the western portions of Lake Nicaragua, Ometepe, and the Gulf of Fonseca. The area now covered by Rivas Department appears to have been conquered by the Nicarao shortly before the Spanish conquest.

=== Major settlements ===
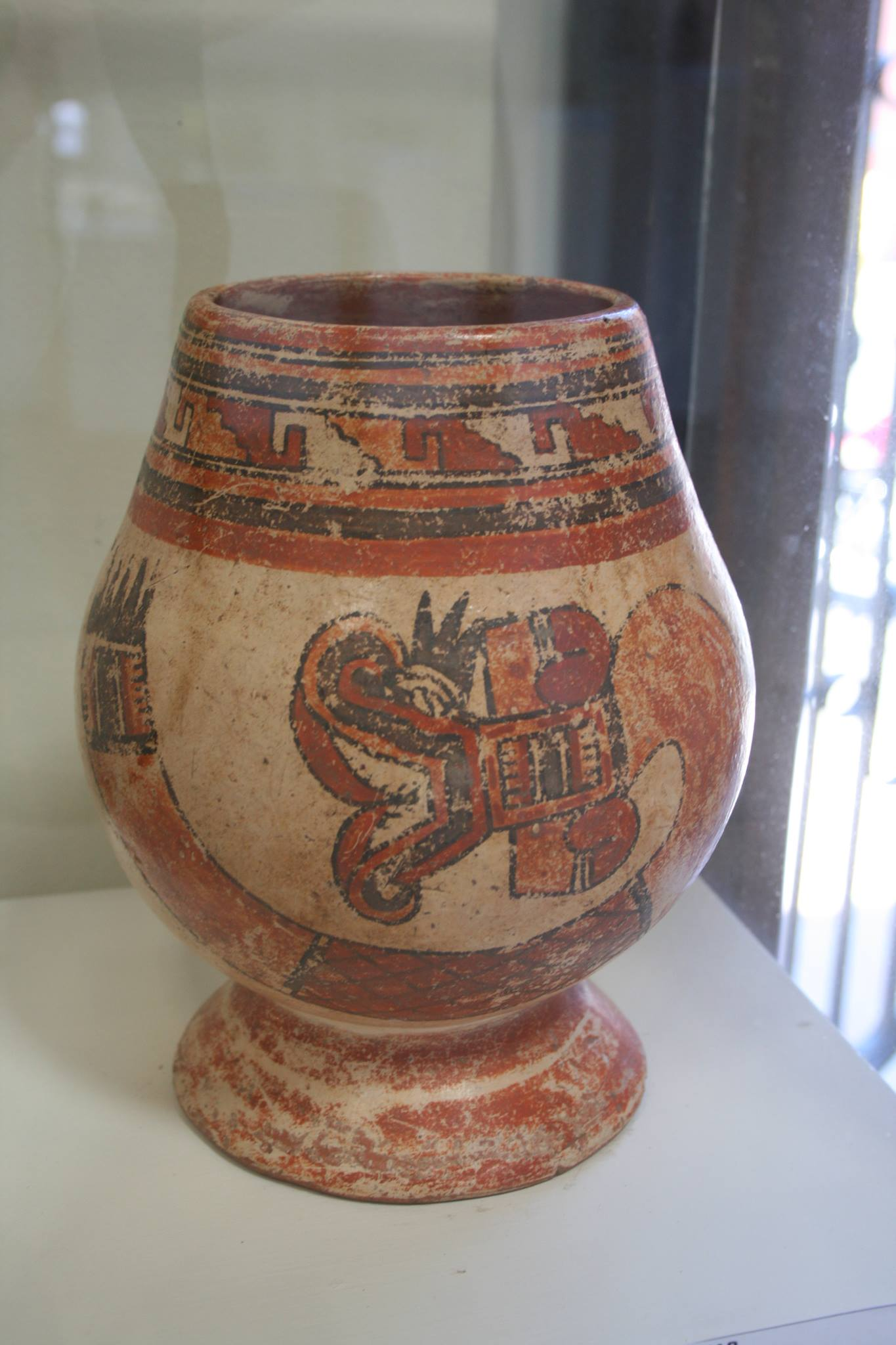
Nicarao vase depicting Quetzalcoatl (800-1350 CE), near the Asososca lagoon (Managua), Nicaragua

At the time of contact with the Spanish, the Nicarao were governed from their capital at Quauhcapolca, near the modern town of Rivas. Other principal settlements included Ometepe, Asososca Lagoon (Managua), Mistega, Ochomogo, Oxmorio, Papagayo, Tecoatega, Teoca, Totoaca, and Xoxoyota.

== Culture ==
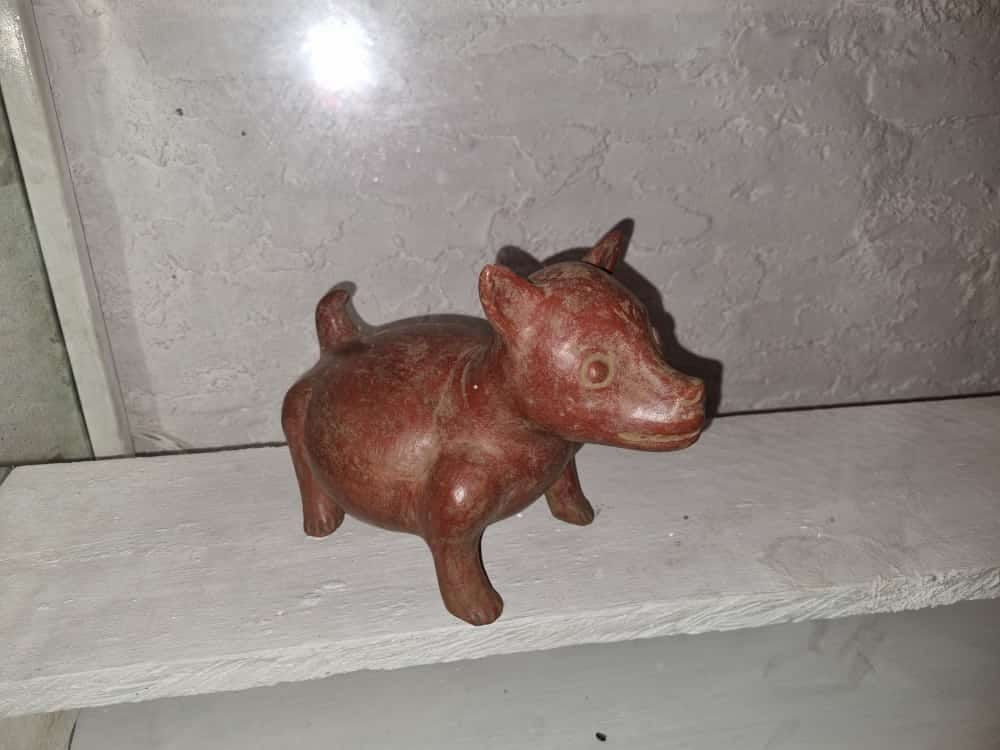
A pre-Columbian Nicarao effigy of a Techichi, Rivas, Nicaragua.

Like most other Nahua groups, the Nicarao were agriculturalists, and cultivated maize, cacao, cotton, tomatoes, avocados, potatoes, squash, beans, chili and various fruits using the milpa system. Modern Nicaraos continue to be mainly farmers and agriculturalists and contribute to the cultivation of countless fruits and crops. In the Masaya department, cocoa production continues to be dominated by the Nicaraos. Chocolate was fundamental to pre-Columbian Nicarao culture as it was drunk during special ceremonies in addition to cocoa beans being used as their currency. The Nicarao also dined on various meats such as turkey, deer, iguana, mute dogs, and fish from the sea, rivers, lakes and lagoons. The Nicarao had elaborate markets (tianguez) and permanent temples (referred to by the Spanish as ochilobos, possibly referring to Huitzilopochtli) indicating some level of expertise in architecture, which have since been completely destroyed by the Spanish. Men were banned from entering markets, with the exception of virgins and slaves. Nicarao commoners were monogamous, but nobles practiced polygamy, though they designated one legitimate wife for the purpose of inheritance.

In contrast to their central Mexican counterparts who strictly reserved cotton for high-status members of Aztec society, cotton clothing was an everyday commodity in Greater Nicoyan society for commoners, upper class, and lower class alike. Nicarao men wore traditional cotton ponchos as their daily wear, while the women wore cotton Huipiles. Furthermore, the Pacific coast of Nicaragua was a cotton-producing power in Mesoamerica due to its rich soil and immense bodies of water, which allowed the Nicaraos to grow excessive amounts of cotton which is a water-intensive crop. This combination of suitable lands with the abundance of water established cotton textiles as a common commodity rather than a luxury exclusive to the elite.

Many of the Nicarao were artisans with expertise in crafts such as pottery and goldsmithing. Tattoo artistry across the face and body was prized among a few Nicaraos, as observed by the Spanish and reflected in effigies and clay artwork they created; this trait was shared by neighboring peoples to the south as well as the Maya people to the north. Among the Nicarao, highly specialized tattoo artists were experts and lived by their skills. However, the Spanish witnessed only a few tattooed natives in the Nicarao populace, therefore tattooing was not part of Nicarao culture and those who were tattooed were most likely Isthmo-Colombian natives rather than Nahuas. The Nicarao also practiced stonecraft, as evidenced by elaborate petroglyphs of spirals, murals and spiritual figures carved and painted onto stones in Ometepe; this was shared by the Chorotega and other pre-Columbian civilizations in the region.

Spanish chronicler Gonzalo Fernández de Oviedo y Valdés, writing soon after the conquest, recorded that the Nicarao practised cranial modification, by binding the heads of young children between two pieces of wood. Archaeologists have unearthed pre-Columbian burials in the former Nicarao region with evidence of both cranial and dental modification.

== Pantheon and religious beliefs ==
The Nicarao possessed a number of cultural traits in common with North American peoples as well as the Toltecs of central Mexico, including an identical calendar, the use of screenfold books, worship of the Great Spirit and a Toltec pantheon of deities such as sky spirits, animal spirits and Tonal mythology, Nagual mysticism, and treaties. They also, in common with their Mexican cousins from the Aztec culture, practiced ritual confession, and the volador (flying men) ritual.

Francisco de Bobadilla recorded information on the religion of the Nicarao, which shows clear ties to the Aztec pantheon, though his spelling is inconsistent and reflects the Nicarao dialect. Deities worshipped by the Nicarao include Tamagazque (Tlamacazqui, a name for Tlaloc), Cipactonal, Oxomogo (Oxomoco), Calchitguegue (possibly Chalchiuhtlicue), Chicociagat (Chicoace Acatl, the calendrical name of Centeotl), Mixcoa (Mixcoatl), "Bisteot" (god of hunger, a corruption of Apizteot), Chiquinaut or Hecat (Chicnaui Ehecatl, the calendrical name of Quetzalcoatl), Miqtanteot (Mictlantecuhtli). The gods Mazat ("deer") and Toste ("rabbit") were invoked for good luck when hunting these animals. Quiateot ("god of rain") was the son of Omeyateite (Ometecuhtli) and Omeyatecigoat (Omecihuatl). Xipe Totec was probably present, but may not have been as prominent as among their Pipil relatives. There were also gods of cacao (honored in the volador ceremony), corn, beans and cotton, as well as two principal "angels" called Taraacazcati and Tamacastovaz alongside other minor angels called Tamachas. One great god named Thomaotheot had a son named Theotbilche who resided upon the earth.

Tamagazque and Cipactonal, along with Oxomogo, Calchitguegue, and Chicociagat, were believed to be responsible for recreating the world after it had been destroyed by a flood, mostly likely a version of the Aztec Five Suns myth. Those who died in battle or lived a good life of religious devotion went to the heavens, while those who were wicked or died at home went to Mictlan. Children who died young were born again to the same parents.

Nicarao priests were referred to as tamagest.

== Legacy ==
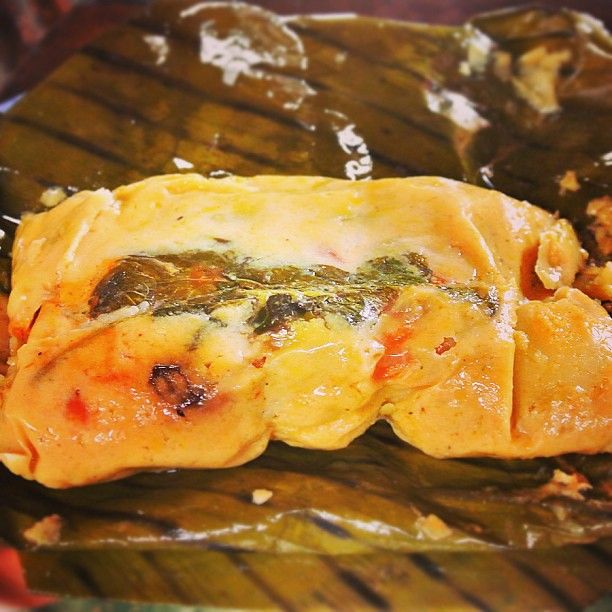
Nacatamales, one of Nicaragua's most popular and beloved dishes, originated from the Nicarao people, and is cemented in Nicaraguan gastronomy

Despite their massive decrease in population and the loss of their native language in the aftermath of Spanish conquest, the Nicarao, and their culture, are still an integral part of Nicaraguan identity as they formed the ethnic foundation of the country. Most western Nicaraguans have Nahua ancestry, as proven through DNA analysis. Towns, lakes, islands, and volcanoes bear their place names. The etymology of the country's name derives from their native language. Nicaraguan Spanish has been heavily influenced by their native language. Nicaraguan foods such as the nacatamal and indio viejo, both of which originated among the Nicarao, have also cemented itself in the Nahua legacy of Nicaragua.

In 2023, the television series Star Trek: Prodigy confirmed the character Commander Chakotay was descended from the Nicarao people of Ometepe. His full ancestry was previously left unspecified in the series Star Trek: Voyager.
