= List of rain deities =

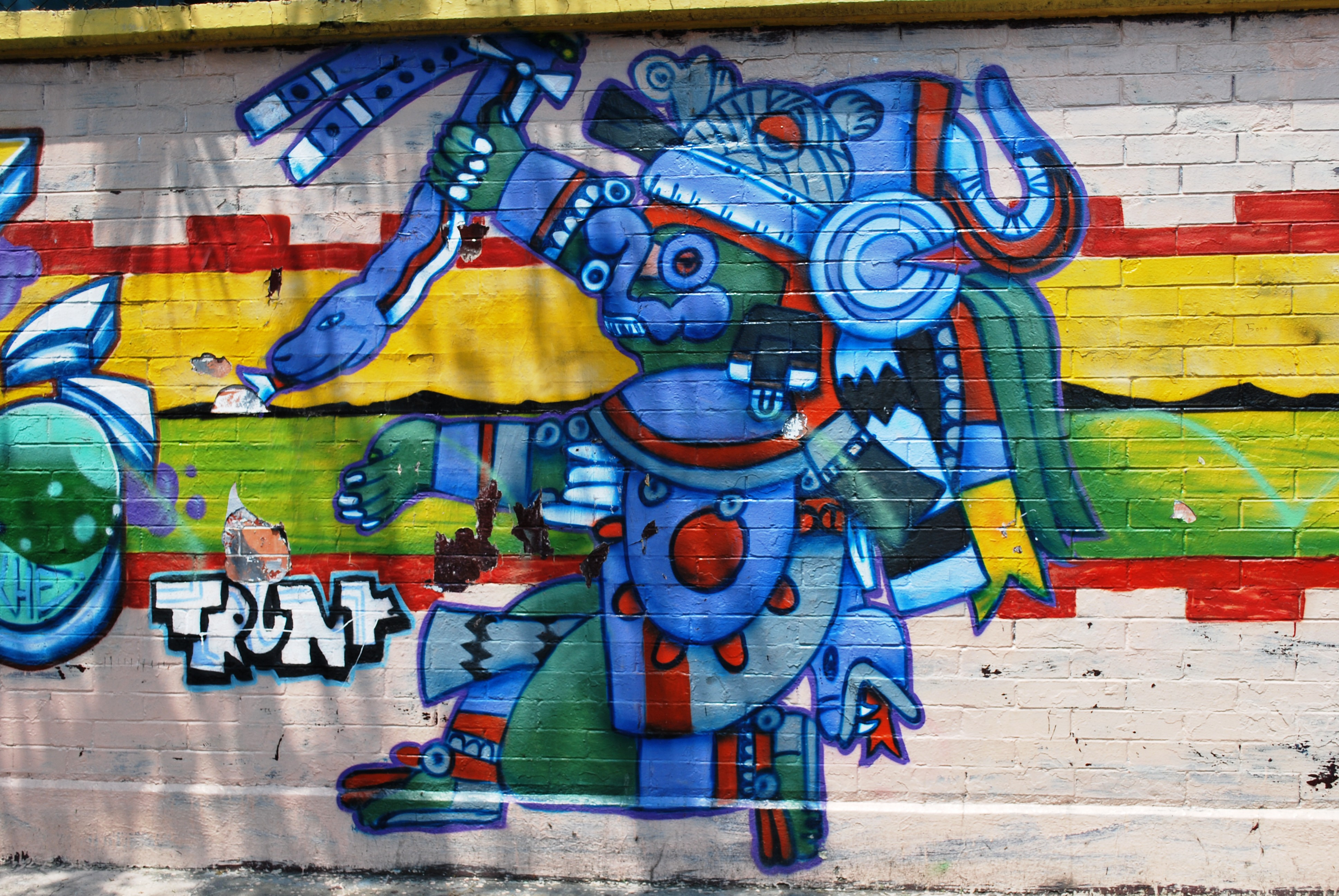
Aztec god Tlaloc, Millan Primary School in Mexico City

There are many different gods of rain in different religions:

== African ==
=== African mythology ===
- Anẓar, god of rain in Berber mythology.
- Achek, wife of the rain god Deng in Dinka mythology
- Mangwe, a water spirit known as "the flooder" in the beliefs of the Ila people of Zambia
- Oya, goddess of violent rainstorms in Yoruba mythology
- Mpulu Bunzi, god of rain in Kongo mythology.
- Bunzi, goddess of rain in Woyo mythology (Kongo).
- Saa ngmin, god of rain in Dagaaba mythology
- Fwha, goddess of rain, fertile regions, and the rainy season in Akan mythology
- Amosu, name means 'Giver of Rain' from Akan mythology

== American ==
=== Mesoamerica ===
- Chaac, in Maya religion;
- Tohil, in K'iche' Maya mythology
- Q'uq'umatz, another K'iche' Maya rain god
- Tlaloc, in Aztec and all the other Nahua religions;
- Cocijo, in Zapotec religion;
- Tirípeme Curicaueri, in Purépecha religion;
- Dzahui, in Mixtec religion;
- Mu'ye, in Otomi religion
- Jaguar, in Olmec religion
- Quiateot of the Nicarao people in Nicaragua

=== North America ===
- Yuttoere, in De'ne' and Carrier
- Asiaq, goddess among Greenlandic Inuit, and Inuit in Northern Canada
- Shotokunungwa of Hopi people
- Tó Neinilii of Navajo people
- Coyote (Navajo mythology)

=== South America ===
- Eschetewuarha of Chamacoco
- Chibchacum in the religion of the Muisca

== Asian ==
=== Filipino mythologies ===
- Oden (Bugkalot mythology): deity of the rain, worshiped for its life-giving waters
- Apo Tudo (Ilocano mythology): the deity of the rain
- Anitun Tauo (Sambal mythology): the goddess of wind and rain who was reduced in rank by Malayari for her conceit
- Anitun Tabu (Tagalog mythology): goddess of wind and rain and daughter of Idianale and Dumangan
- Bulan-hari (Tagalog mythology): one of the deities sent by Bathala to aid the people of Pinak; can command rain to fall; married to Bitu-in
- Santonilyo (Bisaya mythology): a deity who brings rain when its image is immersed at sea
- Diwata Kat Sidpan (Tagbanwa mythology): a deity who lives in the western region called Sidpan; controls the rains
- Diwata Kat Libatan (Tagbanwa mythology): a deity who lives in the eastern region called Babatan; controls the rain
- Diwata na Magbabaya (Bukidnon mythology): simply referred as Magbabaya; the good supreme deity and supreme planner who looks like a man; created the earth and the first eight elements, namely bronze, gold, coins, rock, clouds, rain, iron, and water; using the elements, he also created the sea, sky, moon, and stars; also known as the pure god who wills all things; one of three deities living in the realm called Banting
- Tagbanua (Manobo mythology): the god of rain
- Pamulak Manobo (Bagobo mythology): supreme deity and creator of the world, including the land, sea, and the first humans; throws water from the sky, causing rain, while his spit are the showers; controls good harvest, rain, wind, life, and death; in some myths, the chief deity is simply referred as the male deity, Diwata

=== Hindu mythology ===
- Indra
- Mariamman
- Parjanya
- Shakambhari
- Varuna, god of ocean, sky and water

=== Japanese mythology ===
- Kuraokami

=== Middle Eastern mythology ===
- Adad

=== Chinese mythology ===
- Fengxi (mythology)
- Yu Shi
- Loong Wang: Chinese dragon (Loong)

== European ==
=== Greek mythology ===
- Hyades, nymphs that bring rain
- Zeus, god of rain, thunder, and lightning

=== Lithuanian mythology ===
- Blizgulis, god of snow

=== Norse Mythology ===
- Freyr, Norse god of rain, sunshine, summer and fertility

=== Slavic mythology ===
- Dodola, goddess of rain
- Dudumitsa, Bulgarian goddess of rain

=== Gaulish mythology ===
- Taranis, Gaulish god of thunder

== Oceanian ==
=== Australian Aboriginal Dreaming ===
- Bunbulama, in Yolngu mythology
- Wandjina
- Wollunqua

=== Hawaiian mythology ===
- Lono, who was also a fertility god

=== Polynesian mythology ===
- Hiro, god of rain in Rapa Nui mythology.

== See also ==
- Ekendriya
- Weather god
