= Blue-green =

Color

Color coordinates
- Hex triplet: #0D98BA
- sRGB^{B} (r, g, b): (13, 152, 186)
- HSV (h, s, v): (192°, 93%, 73%)
- CIELCh_{uv} (L, C, h): (58, 56, 224°)
- Source: ColorHexa
- B: Normalized to [0–255] (byte); H: Normalized to [0–100] (hundred)

A traditional old-fashioned RYB color wheel

Blue-green is the color between blue and green. It belongs to the cyan family.

== Variations ==
=== Cyan ===
A modern RGB color wheel

Cyan (Aqua)

Color coordinates
- Hex triplet: #00FFFF
- sRGB^{B} (r, g, b): (0, 255, 255)
- HSV (h, s, v): (180°, 100%, 100%)
- CIELCh_{uv} (L, C, h): (91, 72, 192°)
- Source: X11
- ISCC–NBS descriptor: Brilliant bluish green
- B: Normalized to [0–255] (byte)

Cyan is the blue-green color that is between blue and green on a modern RGB color wheel.

The modern RGB color wheel replaced the traditional old-fashioned RYB color wheel because it is possible to display much brighter and more saturated colors using the primary and secondary colors of the RGB color wheel. In the terminology of color theory, RGB color space has a much larger color gamut than RYB color space.

The first recorded use of cyan as a color name in English was in 1879.

=== Turquoise ===
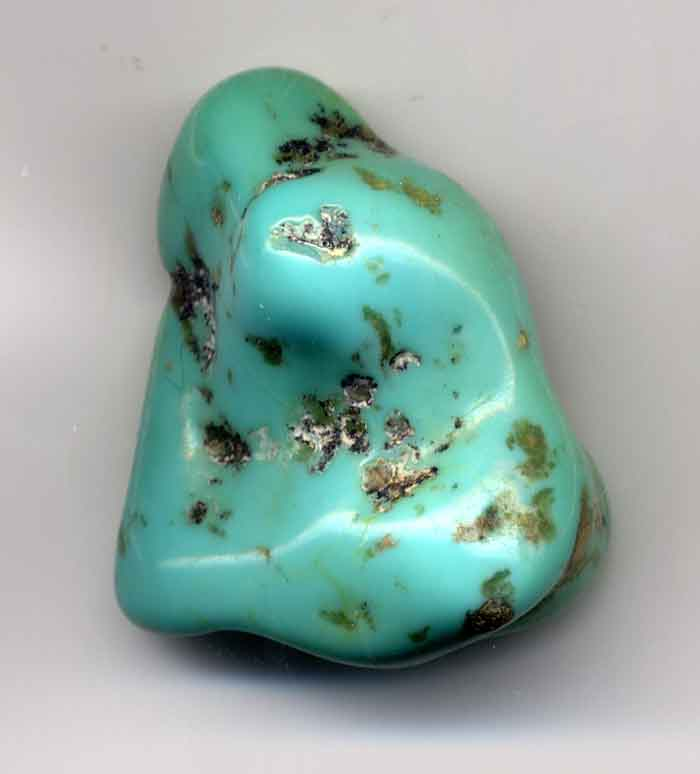
A sample of turquoise

Turquoise

Color coordinates
- Hex triplet: #40E0D0
- sRGB^{B} (r, g, b): (64, 224, 208)
- HSV (h, s, v): (174°, 71%, 88%)
- CIELCh_{uv} (L, C, h): (81, 59, 179°)
- Source: X11
- ISCC–NBS descriptor: Brilliant bluish green
- B: Normalized to [0–255] (byte)

The color turquoise is that of the semi-precious stone turquoise, which is a light tone of blue-green.

Its first recorded use as a color name in English is from 1573.

=== Green-blue ===
Green-blue

Color coordinates
- Hex triplet: #1164B4
- sRGB^{B} (r, g, b): (17, 100, 180)
- HSV (h, s, v): (209°, 91%, 71%)
- CIELCh_{uv} (L, C, h): (42, 76, 252°)
- Source: Crayola
- ISCC–NBS descriptor: Strong blue
- B: Normalized to [0–255] (byte)

Green-blue is a Crayola crayon color from 1958 to 1990.

=== Bondi blue ===
Bondi blue
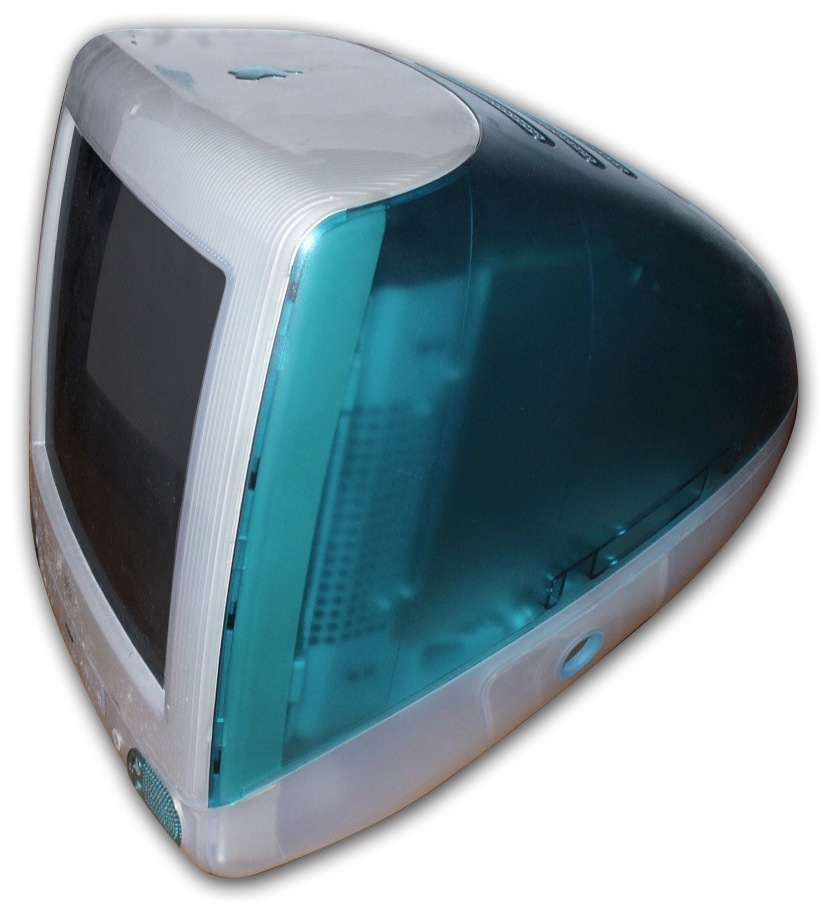

Color coordinates
- Hex triplet: #0095B6
- sRGB^{B} (r, g, b): (0, 149, 182)
- HSV (h, s, v): (191°, 100%, 71%)
- CIELCh_{uv} (L, C, h): (57, 55, 223°)
- Source: Crayola
- B: Normalized to [0–255] (byte)

Bondi blue belongs to the cyan family of blues. It is very similar to the Crayola crayon color "blue-green".

Apple, Inc. assigned the name "Bondi Blue" to the color of the original iMac's back cover when it was introduced in 1998. It is said to be named for the color of the water at Bondi Beach in Sydney, Australia.

=== Blue green (Munsell) ===
Blue green (Munsell)

Color coordinates
- Hex triplet: #00A59C
- sRGB^{B} (r, g, b): (0, 165, 156)
- HSV (h, s, v): (177°, 100%, 65%)
- CIELCh_{uv} (L, C, h): (61, 48, 183°)
- Source: Munsell Color Wheel
- ISCC–NBS descriptor: Brilliant bluish green
- B: Normalized to [0–255] (byte)

One definition of the color is in the Munsell color system (Munsell 5BG) although there is widespread acceptance and knowledge of the color from the so-called blue-green algae which have been recognised and described since the 18th century and probably before that.

=== Cerulean ===
The color cerulean (American English), or caerulean (British English, Commonwealth English), is a variety of the hue of blue that may range from a light azure blue to a more intense sky blue. Cerulean may also be mixed with the hue of green. The first recorded use of cerulean as a color name in English was in 1590. The word is derived from the Latin word caeruleus (Latin: [kaeˈruleus]), "dark blue, blue, or blue-green", which in turn probably derives from caerulum, diminutive of caelum, "heaven, sky".

Cerulean

Color coordinates
- Hex triplet: #007BA7
- sRGB^{B} (r, g, b): (0, 123, 167)
- HSV (h, s, v): (196°, 100%, 65%)
- CIELCh_{uv} (L, C, h): (48, 56, 234°)
- ISCC–NBS descriptor: Strong greenish blue
- B: Normalized to [0–255] (byte)

Cerulean (RGB)

Color coordinates
- Hex triplet: #003FFF
- sRGB^{B} (r, g, b): (0, 63, 255)
- HSV (h, s, v): (225°, 100%, 100%)
- CIELCh_{uv} (L, C, h): (39, 134, 264°)
- ISCC–NBS descriptor: Vivid blue
- B: Normalized to [0–255] (byte)

=== Teal ===
Teal

Color coordinates
- Hex triplet: #008080
- sRGB^{B} (r, g, b): (0, 128, 128)
- HSV (h, s, v): (180°, 100%, 50%)
- CIELCh_{uv} (L, C, h): (48, 38, 192°)
- Source: X11
- ISCC–NBS descriptor: Moderate bluish green
- B: Normalized to [0–255] (byte)

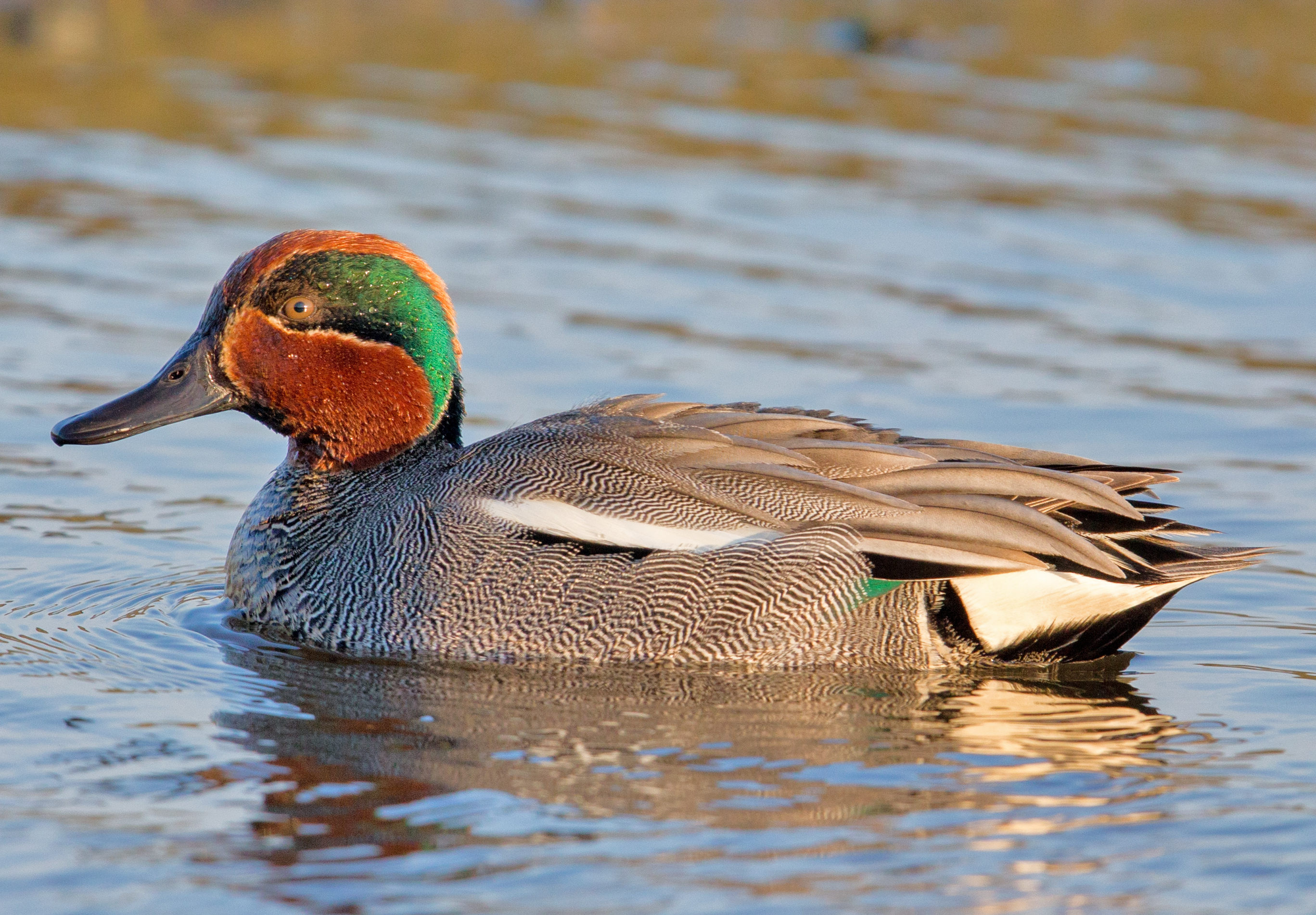
A male Eurasian teal, showing the iridescent blue-green stripe on the head

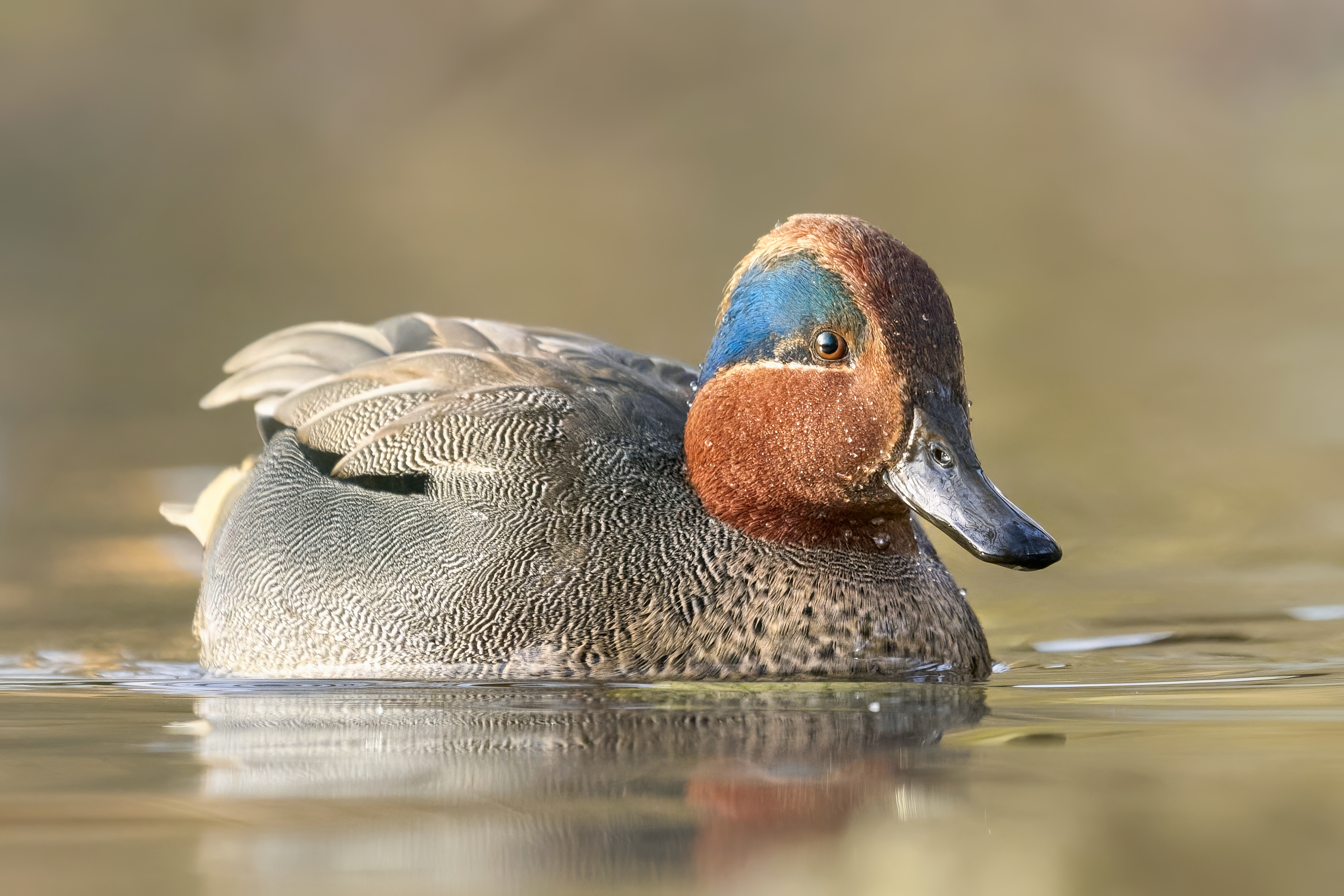
As the color in the teal's head is a structural color, its exact color as perceived by the human eye varies with the angle of light incidence

The flag of Sri Lanka uses teal.

Teal is a dark cyan color. Its name comes from that of a bird, the Eurasian teal (Anas crecca) which has a similarly colored stripe on its head. The word is often used colloquially to refer to shades of cyan in general.

It can be created by mixing cyan with black or gray. It is also one of the first group of 16 HTML/CSS web colors. In the RGB model used to create colors on computer screens and televisions, teal is created by reducing the brightness of cyan to about one half.

In North America, teal became a fad color during the 1990s, with many sports teams adopting it for their uniforms.

== In nature ==
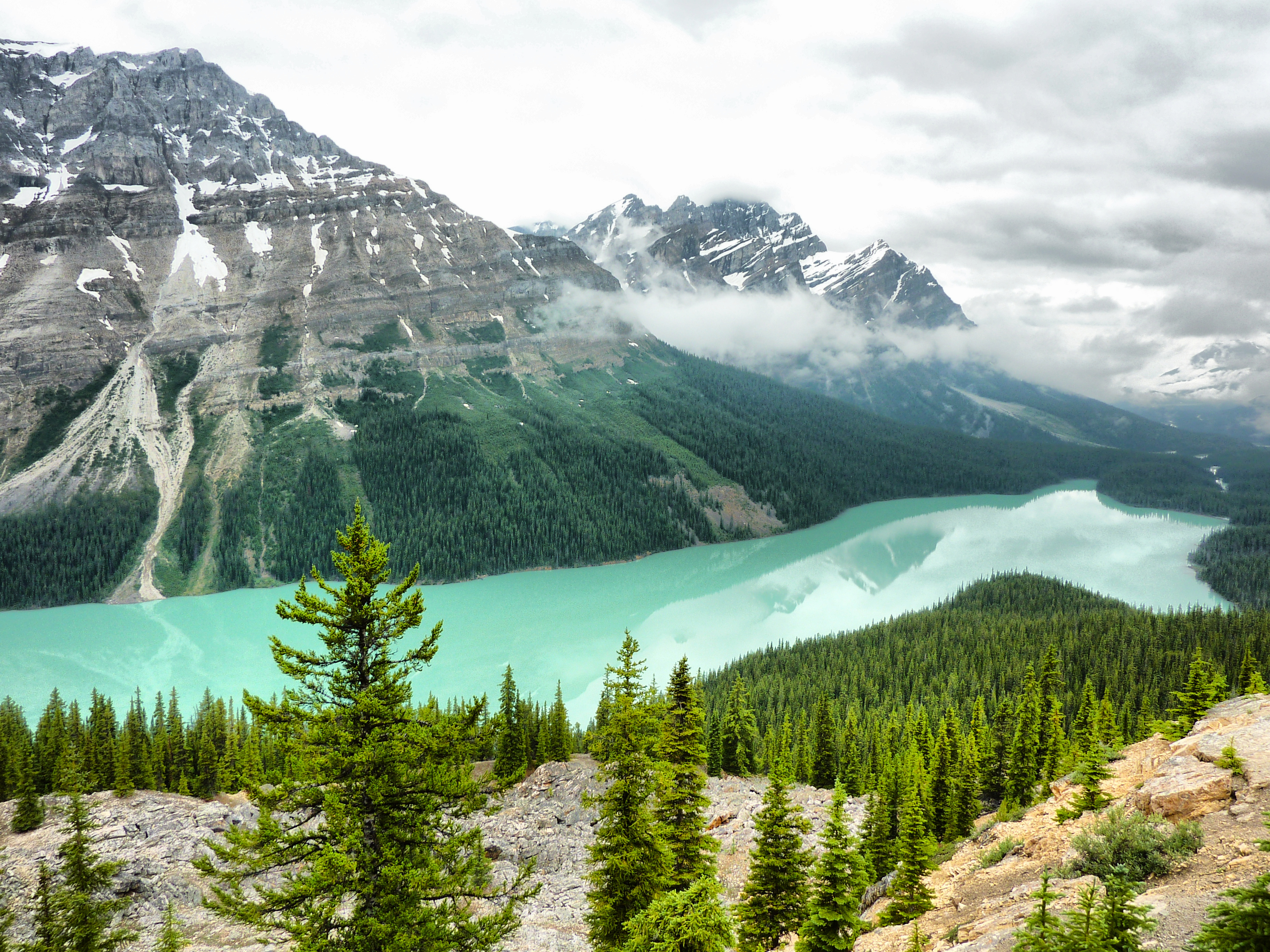
Peyto Lake is colored blue-green in summer by glacial flour.

- Blue-green algae, also called cyanobacteria, are a phylum of bacteria that obtain their energy through photosynthesis.
- The blue-green chromis is a species of damselfish.
- Glacial flour, powdered rock, can turn a lake to a blue-green color.

== In culture ==
- In some languages, blue and green are considered a single color.
- In the iconography of the Virgin of Guadalupe, she is often depicted as wearing a blue-green colored robe. The color is significant to the Mexicas because of the Aztec religion. Also, Blue-green is known as Maya blue in pre-Columbian cultures. In the Nahuatl culture blue represents the center of fire and tonalli. Also sometimes the blue color is diluted so it appears as a turquoise on manuscripts. The color is often used for the representation of Aztec rulers and European kings.
- Variations of blue-green are the political colors (or one of the political colors) of various political parties, including:
  - New Right (Denmark)
  - DENK (The Netherlands)
  - Brexit Party/Reform UK (United Kingdom)
  - People-Animals-Nature (Portugal)
  - Justice Party (United States)
- In Australia, a loosely-aligned group of independent and minor party candidates that ran in the 2022 Australian federal election were called teal independents for their blend of green and blue (Liberal) politics.

== See also ==
- List of colors
- New riddle of induction
