= Nagual =

Shapeshifting sorcerer in Mesoamerican folk religion

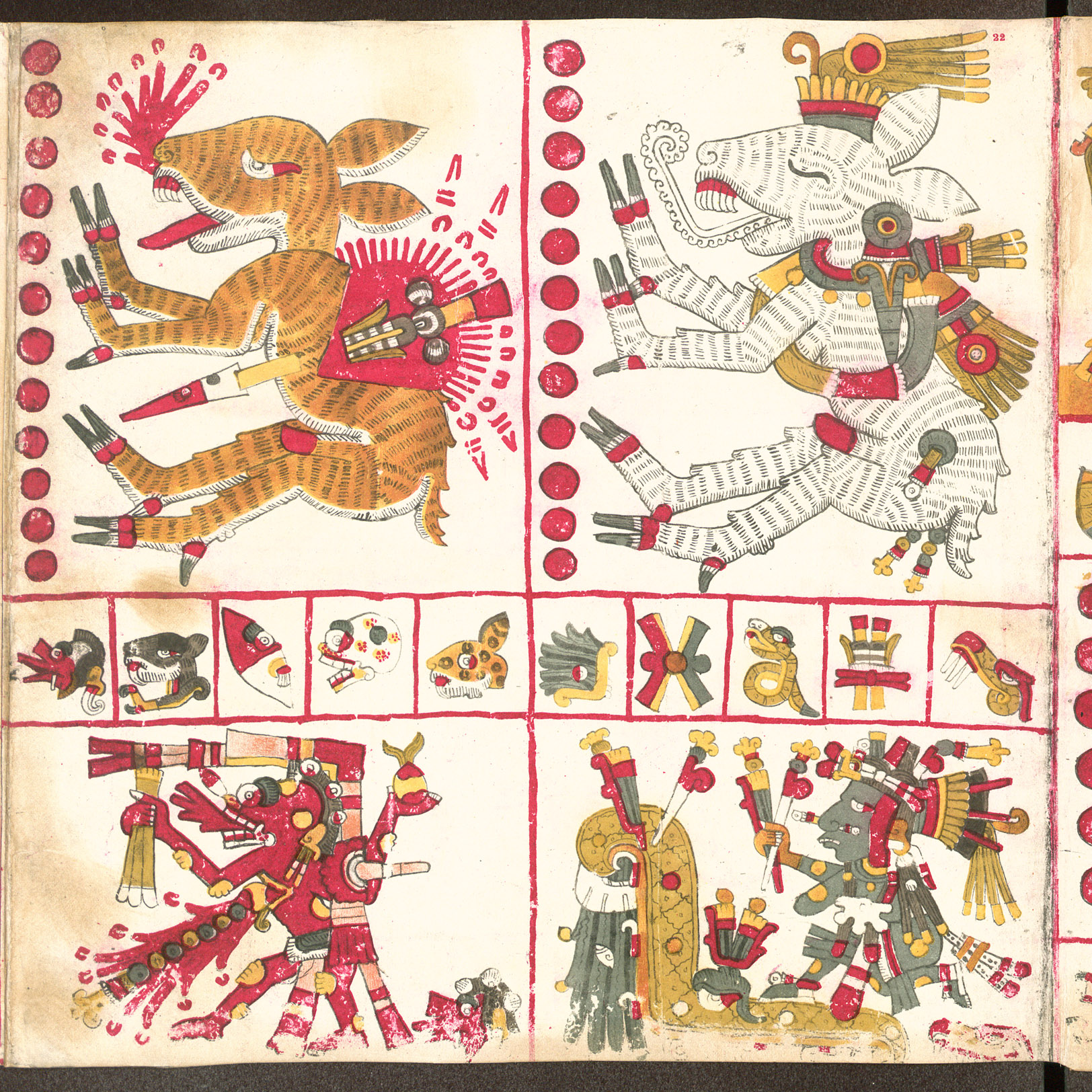
The Nahuals described in the Borgia Codex, metamorphic creatures capable of changing their physical form into any other animal form or even into human forms at will.

In Mesoamerican folk religion, a nagual or nahual (both from the Nahuatl word nāhualli [naˈwaːlːi]) is a human being who has the power to shapeshift into their tonal animal counterpart. Nagualism is tied to the belief one can access power and spiritual insight by connecting with the tonal animal within.

== Etymology ==
The word nagual derives from the Nahuatl word nāhualli [naˈwaːlːi], an indigenous religious practitioner, identified by the Spanish as a 'magician'.

In English, the word is often translated as "transforming witch," but translations without negative connotations include "transforming trickster," "shape shifter," "pure spirit," or "pure being."

== Beliefs ==
A pre-Columbian Chatino stela possibly depicting a nagual transforming into a jaguar. His name is inscribed in Zapotec glyphs on his abdomen and translates to "Five Alligator".

Naguals use their powers for good or evil according to their personality. The general concept of nagualism is Mesoamerican in origin. Nagualism is linked with pre-Columbian shamanistic practices through Pre-classic Olmec and Toltec depictions that are interpreted as human beings transforming themselves into animals. The system is linked with the Mesoamerican calendrical system, used for divination rituals. Birth dates often determine if a person can become a nagual. Mesoamerican belief in tonalism, wherein every person has an animal counterpart to which their life force is linked, is drawn upon by nagualism.

However, modern scholars have struggled to grasp the ever-evolving and contentious meanings associated with Mesoamerican Nahua terms like nahualli and tonalli. This includes their derivatives, such as nahualismo and tonalismo. Hence, it's recommended to use clearer, descriptive language. For instance, instead of discussing nahualism, we can talk about the belief that certain individuals, often in influential social roles, possess specific spiritual abilities. These abilities allow them to transform into animals or even natural phenomena like lightning, wind, clouds, or fireballs, enabling them to perform remarkable feats while in these "disguises."

The nagual trait is acquired at birth, along with other characteristics associated with a person's birth day. Each day is associated with an animal that has strong and weak aspects. A person born on "Dog Day" would have both strong and weak 'dog' aspects. In Nahuatl the word tonalli is used to refer both to a day and to the animal associated with that day.

The nagual is considered different; where the tonal is the day spirit itself, the nagual is the familiar spirit of the day. It is probable that the tonal represents the daytime aspect and the nagual the nighttime aspect of the tonalli, 'the things of the day'. Practitioners of powerful magic were normally born on days related to animals with a strong or harmful aspect. They would have specific tonals such as the jaguar or puma. In Aztec mythology the god Tezcatlipoca was the protector of nagualism, because his tonal was the jaguar and he governed the distribution of wealth.

In modern rural Mexico, nagual is sometimes synonymous with brujo ("wizard"); one who is able to shapeshift into an animal at night (normally into a dog, owl, bat, wolf or turkey), drink blood from human victims, steal property, cause disease, and the like.

In some indigenous communities the nagual is integrated into the religious hierarchy. The community knows who is a nagual, tolerating, fearing and respecting them. Nagualli are hired to remove curses cast by other nagualli. In other communities the accusation of nagualism may result in violent attacks on the accused by the community.

The Western study of nagualism was initiated by archaeologist, linguist, and ethnologist Daniel Garrison Brinton who published Nagualism: A Study in Native-American Folklore and History, which chronicled historical interpretations of the word and those who practiced nagualism in Mexico in 1894. He identified various beliefs associated with nagualism in modern Mexican communities such as the Mixe, the Nahua, the Zapotec and the Mixtec.

Subsequently, many studies have described nagualism in different Mesoamerican cultures such as the Zoques and the Jakaltek, K'iche', Q'eqchi', and Tzeltal Maya. Among the Jacaltek, naguals reinforce indigenism by punishing those who collaborate with non-indigenous Ladinos.

In 1955, Gustavo Correa suggested nagualism is not pre-Columbian, arguing that it was wholly imported from Europe, where he compared it to the medieval belief in werewolves. However, shapeshifting folklore is not limited to Europe, nor to the Middle Ages; for example, some of Earth's oldest literature, the Bronze Age Eastern Semitic Epic of Gilgamesh, and East Asia's Huli Jing (origin of this folklore is of unknown date, but eighteenth century at the latest), contain shapeshifters. The werewolf (lycanthropy) is neither the only nor the earliest form of folklorical therianthropy (shapeshifting from human to animal, or vice versa).

Kaplan concludes that, in Oaxaca, the belief in naguals as evil, shape shifting witches is common in both indigenous and Mestizo populations. According to Kaplan, the belief in animal spirit companions is exclusively indigenous. This is certain for some groups and communities, but for others, such as the Mixes, Chinantecos, Triquis, or Tacuates, those who can control their nahual or alterego are protectors of the people, natural resources and culture of the community, highly revered, but also feared.

The nagual was popularized in shamanism books by author Carlos Castaneda.

== Practice ==
The practice of Nagualism was often accompanied by use of hallucinogens, including peyote, ololiuqui, and psylocibin mushrooms known as teonanácatl. Use of these medicinal herbs were said to unlock powers of perception and insight in those performing the nagual rituals.
