= Teyolía =

Mesoamerican religious concept

Teyolía is an animistic entity of the human being which was physically located in the heart according to the cosmovision of the ancient Aztecs and in the beliefs of some modern indigenous groups from Mexico and Central America.

Together with the tonalli and the ihíyotl was one of the three strengths that brings life and health to the humans. It was the part of the human being considered as the one that transcended to afterlife to different realms according ones way of death. After the Spanish conquest the term was assumed by Spaniard translators as equal to the word "ánima" and "alma" (soul), which have some reminiscences in current expressions among modern indigenous.

== Etymology ==
The Nahuatl word teyolía incorporates the prefix "te-" and the substantive "yolía". The particle "te-" is an indefinite pronominal prefix that indicates possession, so when it is placed before a noun it can be translated as "of somebody, of another, of the people, of some". The noun "yolía" contains the root "yol" meaning "life", consequently it can be translated as "that what makes to live". All together the word teyolía might be translated as "what makes to live the people". It is related etymologically with the word "yollotl", used to describe the heart.

== Description ==
According to the Aztec thought, the teyolía was an animic entity that gives life to the human beings located in the heart and, therefore, inside every person's chest. Related with the half part of the cosmos. In addition to the vitality it was attributed it to be the source of knowledge, tendency, affections, passions, memory and will.

The Aztecs believed that after death the teyolía was the part of the man that separated from the body remained immortal. The teyolía remained some days on the surface of earth be carried afterwards to one of any different destinations in which the Aztecs believed. The final destination of the teyolía was determined by every person's way of death. The teyolía of the warriors, for example, was carried to the sun realm (nepantla tonatiuh) where they turned into beautiful birds.

Among the modern indigenous peoples the term is used in some deformed ways as "yolía", "yolo", "teyolotl", "I:l", "yuhlu", "I:ll(or)"; or, by means of Spanish terms "alma", "ánima" or "espíritu".

== See also ==
- Tonalli
- Ihíyotl

== Bibliography ==
- López Austin, Alfredo (2012a). Cuerpo humano e ideología. Las concepciones de los antiguos nahuas. Vol. I. UNAM.
- López Austin, Alfredo (2012b). Cuerpo humano e ideología. Las concepciones de los antiguos nahuas. Vol. II. UNAM.
