= Etzalcualiztli =

Sixth month of the Aztec calendar

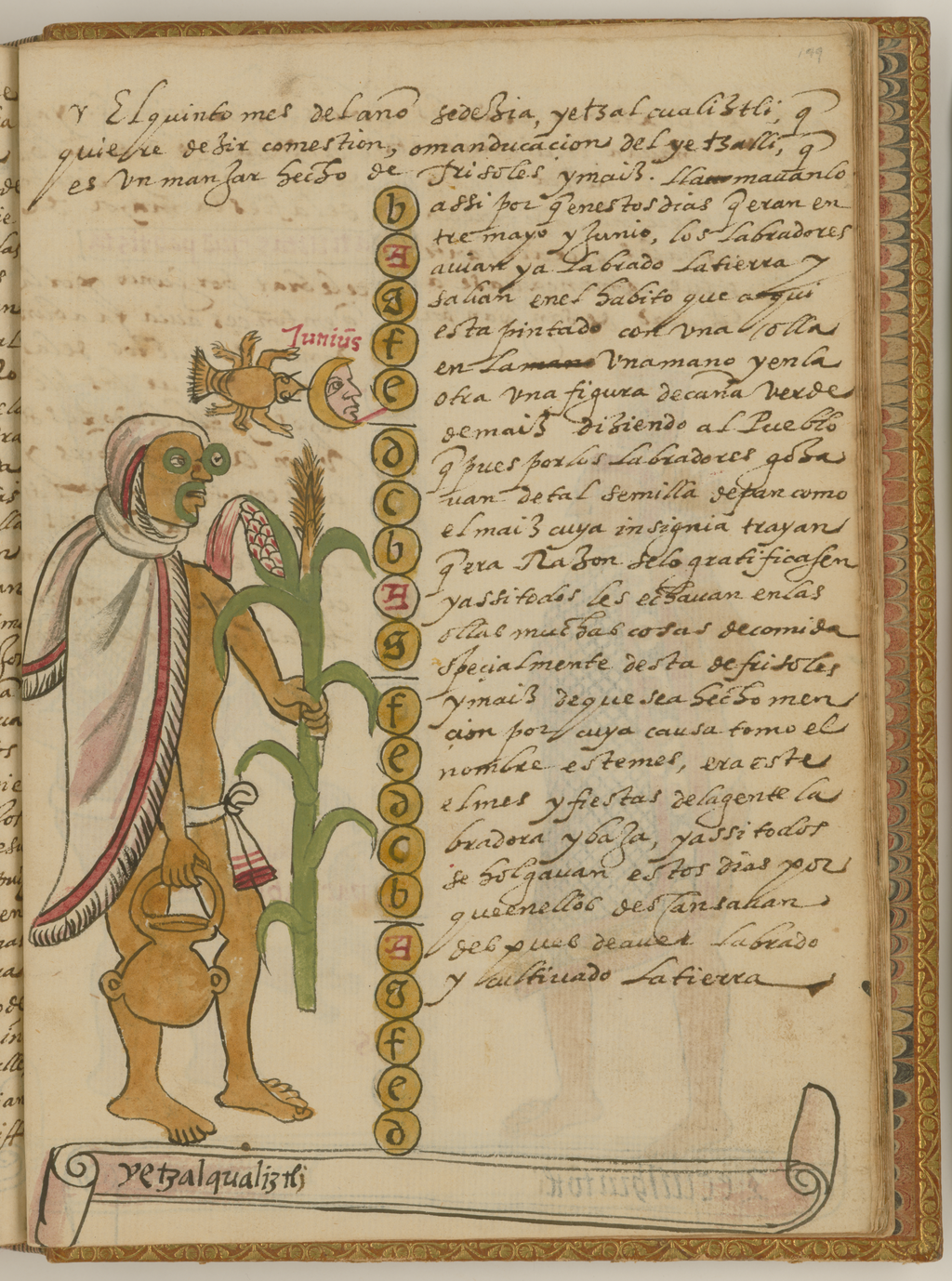
Page from the Tovar Codex, describing the month of Etzalcualiztli with an illustration of Tlaloc

Etzalcualiztli is the name of the sixth month of the Aztec calendar. It is also a festival in the Aztec religion dedicated to Tlaloc and Chalchihuitlicue.
