= Aktzin =

Aktzin (Totonac: Ā'ktzini, "He who makes Thunder") was the god of rain, thunder and lightning for the Totonac people of Mexico. Aktzin corresponds with Tláloc to the Aztecs and Chaac or Cabrakán to the Mayas, and is most commonly syncretised with Saint John the Baptist. However, he also has strong ties with the Archangel Michael.

He existed before the Sun and was owner of all the waters, except the rainwater ironically enough. He lived in the "great water" at the end of the sea and skies to the east, where he acted as the eastern pillar holding the world, his abode has also been described as underground where he creates wooden animals to act as his servants. In accordance to mesoamerican duality; Aktzin was both life giving and life taking, keen to drown the world as those who died by drowning (Totonacan: Mū'xtu'nîn) became his servants; the men forced to dig the river beds, and women forced marry him. The drowned servants live in wells, rivers and springs; where they seek out and drown the living to create more servants. Aktzin is seen as a hunter, drinker and very noisy. It is he who is heard bellowing like a jaguar when rain comes. Stories credit him as the inventor of tubers and friend of animals.

A story of him as Saint John tells how he slayed a giant python called "seventeen heads", who lived in Chicontepec and devastated the population. John tricked the snake and made him fall head first into the sea, where he was chained with the hair of the Virgin, where he remains, only able to move his head and scream. However in other stories, it is Aktzin who is the terrible monster, tricked and chained forever in the sea by the Archangel Michael.

In Tepango, as well as other towns of Totonacapan, he is described as being as large as a mountain, with a golden horn and missing hands.

The Spanish conquerors led by Hernán Cortés encountered the Totonac civilization in 1519, after their initial contact with the Mayas of the Yucatán Peninsula. The Totonac territories were located near the Gulf coast in what is today the state of Veracruz. The city of El Tajín (City of the Thunder God), is an archaeological zone with the remains of the Totonac capital city dating back over 1,000 years.
