= Tláloc =

Deity in Aztec religion; a god of rain and thunder, fertility, and water

- God of Rain, Thunder and Lightning
- Tláloc as depicted in the Codex Magliabechiano
- Other names: Nonohualco, Tláloctlamacazqui, Tláloccantecutli
- Abode: • Tlálocan • Ilhuicatl-Meztli (1st Heaven) • Chalchiuhtlicueyecatl (Gulf of Mexico)
- Gender: Male
- Region: Mesoamerica
- Ethnic group: Aztec (Nahua)
- Festivals: Etzalcualiztli and Huey Tozoztli

Genealogy
- Parents: Created by the Tezcatlipocas (Codex Zumarraga)
- Siblings: None
- Consort: Xochiquetzal (1st) and Chalchiuhtlicue (2nd)
- Children: • With Chalchiuhtlicue: the Tlaloque (Nappatecuhtli, Tomiyauhtecuhtli, Opochtli, Yauhtli) and Huixtocihuatl

Equivalents
- Maya: Chaac (God B)
- Mixtec: Ñuhu-Dzahui
- Zapotec: Pitao-Cocijo
- Totonac: Aktzin
- Otomi: Hmü’ye
- Mixe: Poj 'Enee

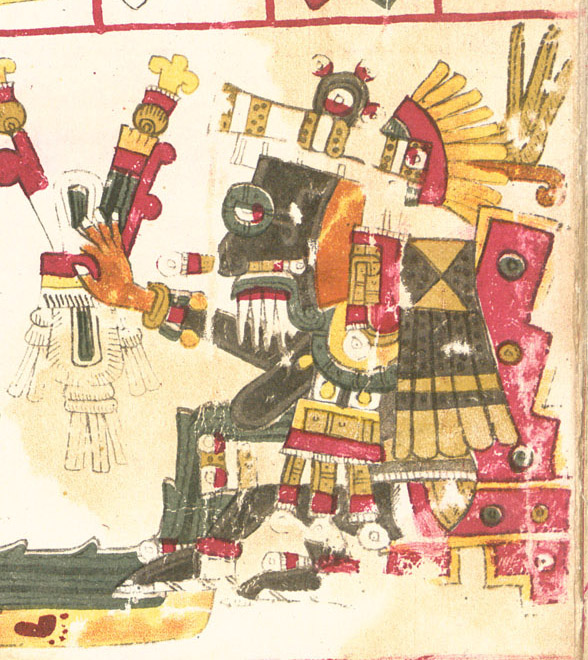
Tláloc in the Codex Borgia

Tláloc in the Codex Laud

Tláloc (Classical Nahuatl: Tláloc [ˈtɬaːlok]) is the god of rain in Aztec religion. He was also a deity of earthly fertility and water, and worshipped as a giver of life and sustenance; many rituals and sacrifices predicated upon these aspects were held in his name. He was feared—albeit not as a malicious figure—for his power over hail, thunder, lightning, and rain. He is also associated with caves, springs, and mountains, most specifically the sacred mountain where he was believed to reside. Cerro Tláloc is very important in understanding how rituals surrounding this deity played out. Tláloc appears to be one of the oldest and most universal figures of worship in ancient Mexico.

There are many different representations of Tláloc, and there are many different offerings given to him. Tláloc is often represented through iconography of butterflies, jaguars, and serpents. The Mexican marigold, Tagetes lucida, known to the Nahua as cempohualxochitl, was another important symbol of the god, and was burned as a ritual incense in native religious ceremonies. Representations of Tláloc are distinguished by the presence of fangs, whether that be three or four of the same size, or just two, paired with the traditional bifurcated tongue. Often, but not always, Tláloc will also be carrying some sort of vessel that contains water.

Although the name Tláloc is specifically Nahuatl, worship of a storm god, associated with mountaintop shrines and with life-giving rain, is as at least as old as Teotihuacan. It was likely adopted from the Maya god Chaac, perhaps ultimately derived from an earlier Olmec precursor. Tláloc was mainly worshiped at Teotihuacan, while his big rituals were held on Cerro Tláloc. An underground Tláloc shrine has been found at Teotihuacan which shows many offerings left for this deity.

== Deity iconography ==
In Aztec iconography, many different sculptures, and pieces of work have been mislabeled or mistaken as Tláloc. For a while, anything that was abstract and on the scarier side was labelled as Tláloc. However, in reality, Tláloc's two main identifiers are fangs, along with ringed eyes. Furthermore, his lips are a very defining feature – they are shaped like a mustache. He is most often coupled with lightning, maize, and water in visual representations and artwork. Other forms of Tláloc include a variety of elements or symbols: jaguar, serpent, owl, water lily, bifurcated tongue, quetzal, butterfly, shell, spider, eye-of-the-reptile symbol, cross Venus / symbol. The number of different symbols associated with Tláloc stem from past, widespread confusion on the deity's appearance, along with the old, widespread worship of this deity.

Offerings dedicated to Tláloc in Tenochtitlan were known to include several jaguar skulls and even a complete jaguar skeleton. The Mexica held Jaguars to a very high standard, associated with the underworld, Jaguars were considered the ultimate sacrificial animal due to their value, which the Mexica decided was high.

Tláloc's impersonators often wore the distinctive mask and heron-feather headdress, usually carrying a cornstalk or a symbolic lightning bolt wand; another symbol was a ritual water jar. Along with this, Tláloc is manifested in the form of boulders at shrine-sites, and in the Valley of Mexico the primary shrine of this deity was located atop Cerro Tláloc. Cerro Tláloc was where human sacrifice was held, in the name of the water deity.

In Coatlinchan, a colossal statue weighing 168 tons was found that was thought to represent Tláloc. However, one scholar believes that the statue may not have been Tláloc at all but his sister or some other female deity. This is a classic confusion as nobody could seem to figure out what was Tláloc, and what was not. This statue was relocated to the National Museum of Anthropology in Mexico City in 1964.

While pre-Hispanic cultures are thought to have become extinct once the Spanish had completed the colonization of Mexico, aspects of pre-Hispanic cultures continue to influence Mexican culture. Accordingly, Tláloc has continued to be represented in Mexican culture even after the Spanish were thought to have completed evangelizing in Mexico. In fact, even as the Spanish were beginning to proselytize in Mexico, religious syncretism was occurring. Analyses of evangelization plays put on by the Spanish, in order to convert the indigenous peoples to Christianity, suggests that the Spanish might have unknowingly created connections between Christianity and indigenous religious figures, such as Tláloc. Indigenous Mexicans viewing these plays might have made connections between the sacrifice Abraham was willing to make of Isaac, to the sacrifices that were made to Tláloc and other deities. These connections may have allowed indigenous peoples to retain ideas about sacrifice even as they were being forcibly converted to Christianity. Early syncretism between indigenous religions and Christianity, also included more direct connections to Tláloc. Some churches built during the sixteenth century, such as the Santiago Tlatelolco church had stones depicting Tláloc within the interior of the church. Even as the Roman Catholic Church sought to eradicate indigenous religious traditions, depiction of Tláloc still remained within worship spaces, suggesting that Tláloc would still have been worshipped after Spanish colonization. It is clear that Tláloc would have continued to have played a role in Mexican cultures immediately after colonization.

Despite the fact that it has been half a millennium since the conquest of Mexico, Tláloc still plays a role in shaping Mexican culture. At Coatlinchan, a giant statue of Tláloc continues to play a key role in shaping local culture, even after the statue was relocated to Mexico City. In Coatlinchan, people still celebrate the statue of Tláloc, so much so that some local residents still seek to worship him, while the local municipality has also erected a reproduction of the original statue. This makes sense as Tláloc is one of the most renowned deities, who has to this day many believers and followers. Many residents of Coatlinchan, relate to the statue of Tláloc in the way that they might associate themselves with a patron saint, linking their identity as a resident of the town with the image of Tláloc. While Tláloc plays an especially important role in the lives of the people of Coatlinchan, the god also plays an important role in shaping the Mexican identity. Images of Tláloc are found throughout Mexico from Tijuana to the Yucatán, and images of the statue of Tláloc found at Coatlinchan are deployed as a symbol of the Mexican nation. Tláloc and other pre-Hispanic features are critical to creating a common Mexican identity that unites people throughout Mexico. Due to the fact that many scholars believe that Tláloc also has Mayan roots, this widespread appreciation is common in Mesoamerica. Accordingly, people throughout Mexico, and especially in Coatlinchan, refer to Tláloc in very anthropomorphized ways, referring to Tláloc as a person, as the Mexica did with many deities. Furthermore, people continue to observe superstitions about Tláloc. Despite centuries of colonial erasure, Tláloc continues to be represented in American culture.

== Mesoamerican representations ==
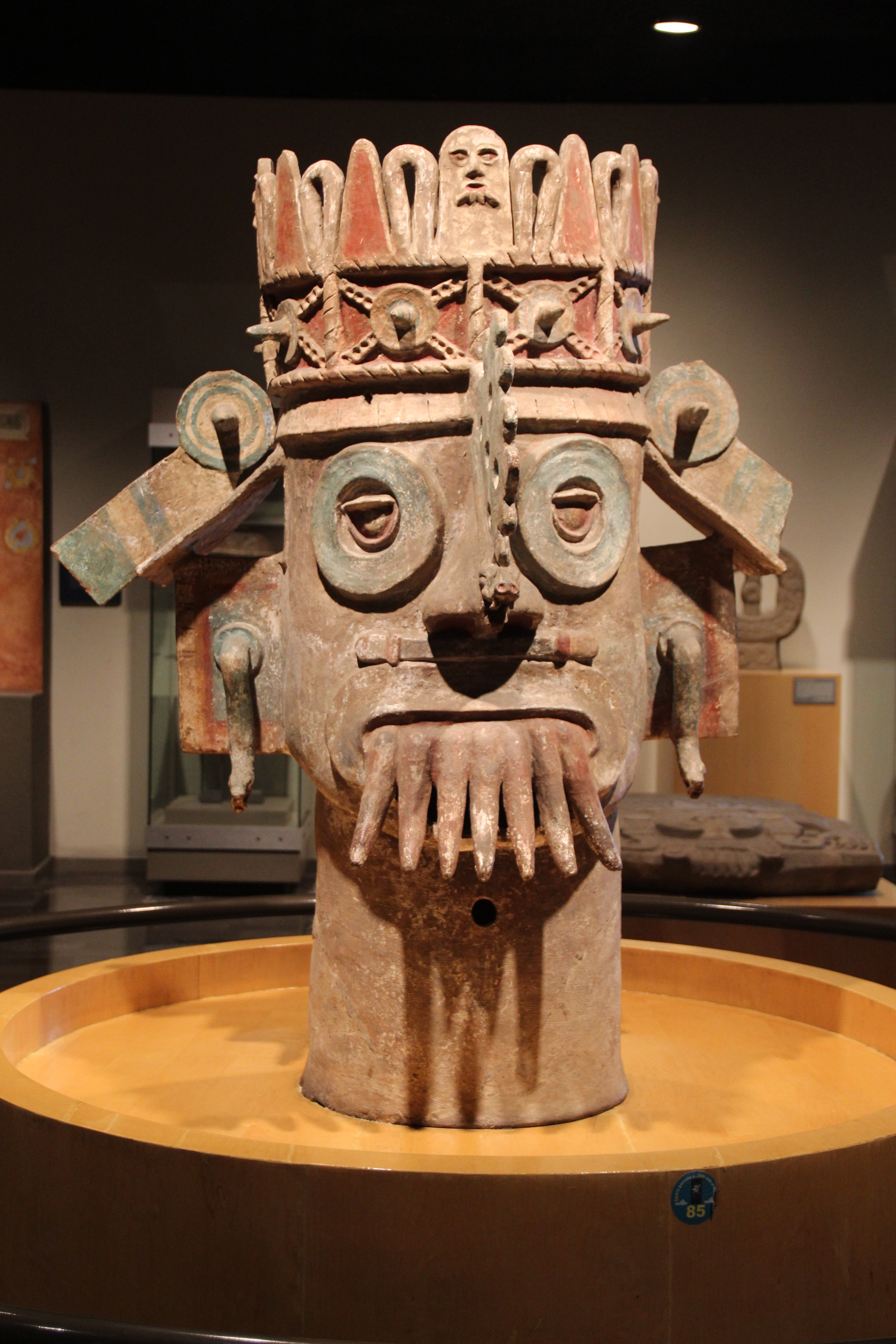
A brazier depicting Tláloc from Ozuluama, Classic Veracruz culture.

Evidence suggests that Tláloc was represented in many other Mesoamerican cultures and religions. Tláloc is thought to be one of the most commonly worshipped deities at Teotihuacan and it is specifically here, in Teotihuacan, that representations of Tláloc often show him having jaguar teeth and features. This differs from the Maya version of Tláloc, as the Maya representation depicts no specific relation to jaguars. The inhabitants of Teotihuacan thought of thunder as the rumblings of the jaguar and associated thunder with Tláloc as well. It is likely that this god was given these associations because he is also known as "the provider" among the Aztecs.

A chacmool excavated from the Maya site of Chichén Itzá in the Yucatán by Augustus Le Plongeon possesses imagery associated with Tláloc. This chacmool is similar to others found at the Templo Mayor in Tenochtitlán. The chacmool found at Chichén Itzá appears to have been used for sacrificial purposes, as the chacmool is shaped like a captive who has been bound. Likewise, two of the chacmools that have been found at Templo Mayor make clear reference to Tláloc. The first chacmool portrays Tláloc three times. Once on the vessel for collecting the blood and heart of sacrificed victims, once on the underpart of the chacmool with aquatic motifs related to Tláloc, and the actual figure of the chacmool itself is of Tláloc as the figure portrays the iconic goggle eyes and large fangs. The other chacmool was found at the Tláloc half of the double pyramid-temple complex and clearly represents Tláloc for the same reasons. In addition to the chacmools, human corpses were found in close proximity to the Tlálocan half of Templo Mayor, which were likely war captives.

These archaeological findings could explain why the Maya tended to associate their version of Tláloc, Chaac, with the bloodiness of war and sacrifice, because they adopted it from the Aztecs, who used Maya captives for sacrifice to Tláloc. Furthermore, Tláloc can be seen in many examples of Maya war imagery and war-time decoration, such as appearing on “shields, masks, and headdresses of warriors.” This evidence affirms the Maya triple connection between war-time, sacrifice, and the rain deity as they likely adopted the rain deity from the Aztecs, but blurred the line between sacrifice and captive capture, and religion.

Tláloc was also associated with the earth, and it is believed this is also a reason why sacrifices may have been made to him. Sacrifices to Tláloc were not solely a Maya phenomenon, and it is known that the Aztecs also made sacrifices to Tláloc. Just as the Maya had also worshipped their own version of Tláloc, so did the Mixtec people of Oaxaca, who were known to worship a rain god that is extremely similar to other manifestations of Tláloc.

== Historical cosmology ==
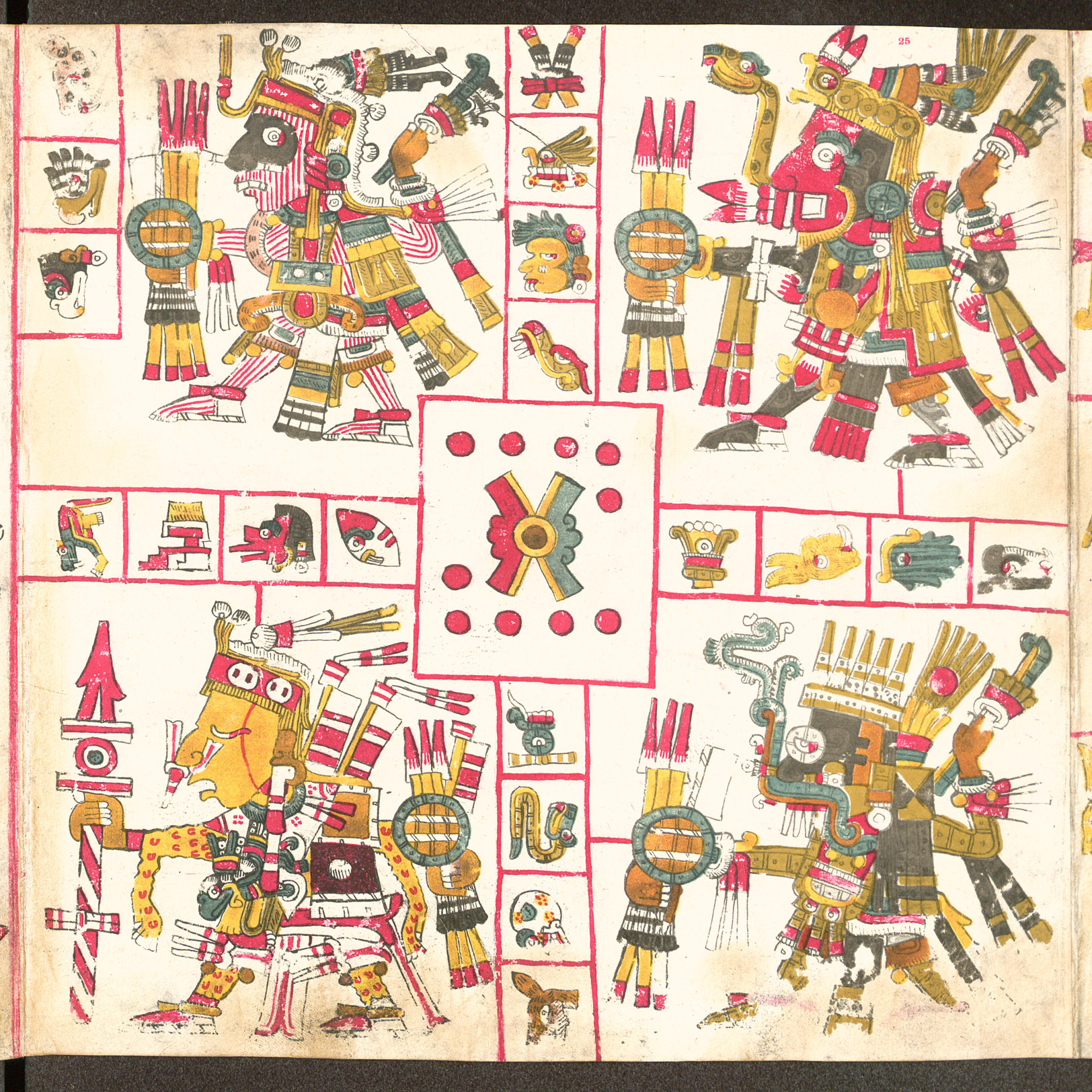
Depiction of Patterns of War, Tláloc (bottom right)

In Aztec cosmology, the four corners of the universe are marked by "the four Tlálocs" (Classical Nahuatl: Tlālōquê [tɬaːˈloːkeʔ]) which both hold up the sky and function as the frame for the passing of time. Tláloc was the patron of the Calendar day Mazātl. In Aztec mythology, Tláloc was the lord of the third sun which was destroyed by fire.

On page 28 of the Codex Borgia, the Five Tlaloque are pictured watering maize fields. Each Tláloc is pictured watering the maize with differing types of rains, of which only one was beneficial. The rain that was beneficial to the land was burnished with jade crystals and likely represented the type of rain that would make a bountiful harvest. The other forms of rain were depicted as destroyers of crops, “fiery rain, fungus rain, wind rain, and flint blade rain”. This depiction shows the power that Tláloc had over the Central American crop supply. Also, the high ratio of damaging rains to beneficial rains likely symbolizes the ratio of the likelihood that crops are destroyed to them being nourished. This would explain why so much effort and resources were put forth by the Central Americans in order to appease the gods.

Additionally, Tláloc is thought to be one of the patron deities of the trecena of 1 Quiahuitl (along with Chicomecoatl). Trecenas are the thirteen-day periods into which the 260-day calendar is divided. The first day of each trecena dictates the augury, or omen, and the patron deity or deities associated with the trecena.

In Aztec mythic cosmography, Tláloc ruled the fourth layer of the upper world, or heavens, which is called Tlálocan ("place of Tláloc") in several Aztec codices, such as the Vaticanus A and Florentine codices. Described as a place of unending springtime and a paradise of green plants, Tlálocan was the destination in the afterlife for those who died violently from phenomena associated with water, such as by lightning, drowning, and water-borne diseases. These violent deaths also included leprosy, venereal disease, sores, dropsy, scabies, gout, and child sacrifices.

The Nahua believed that Huitzilopochtli could provide them with fair weather for their crops and they placed an image of Tláloc, who was the rain-god, near him so that if necessary, the war god could compel the rain maker to exert his powers.

== Etymology ==
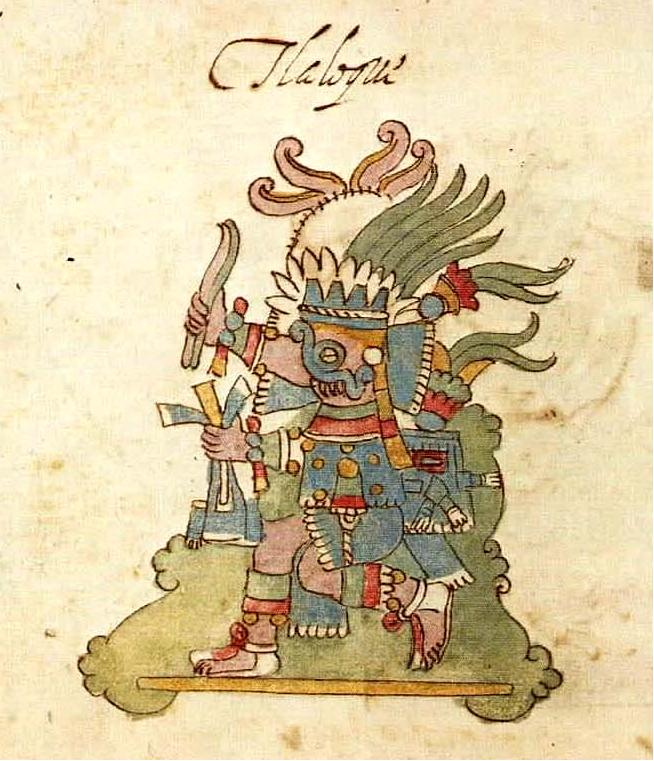
Tláloc, as shown in the late 16th century Codex Ríos.

Tláloc was also associated with the world of the dead and with the earth. His name is thought to be derived from the Nahuatl word tlālli "earth", and its meaning has been interpreted as "path beneath the earth," "long cave," "he who is made of earth", as well as "he who is the embodiment of the earth". J. Richard Andrews interprets it as "one that lies on the land," identifying Tláloc as a cloud resting on the mountaintops. Other names of Tláloc were Tlamacazqui ("Giver") and Xoxouhqui ("Green One"); and (among the contemporary Nahua of Veracruz), Chaneco.

== Child sacrifice and rituals ==
In the Aztec capital Tenochtitlan, one of the two shrines on top of the Great Temple was dedicated to Tláloc. The high priest who was in charge of the Tláloc shrine was called "Quetzalcoatl Tláloc Tlamacazqui." It was the northernmost side of this temple that was dedicated to Tláloc, the god of rain and agricultural fertility. In this area, a bowl was kept in which sacrificial hearts were placed on certain occasions, as offerings to the rain gods. Although the Great Temple had its northern section dedicated to Tláloc, the most important site of worship of the rain god was on the peak of Cerro Tláloc, a 4,100 metres (13,500 ft) mountain on the eastern rim of the Valley of Mexico. Here the Aztec ruler would come and conduct important ceremonies annually. Additionally, throughout the year, pilgrims came to the mountain and offered precious stones and figures at the shrine. Many of the offerings found here also related to water and the sea.

The Tlálocan-bound dead were not cremated as was customary, but instead they were buried in the earth with seeds planted in their faces and blue paint covering their foreheads. Their bodies were dressed in paper and accompanied by a digging stick for planting put in their hands.

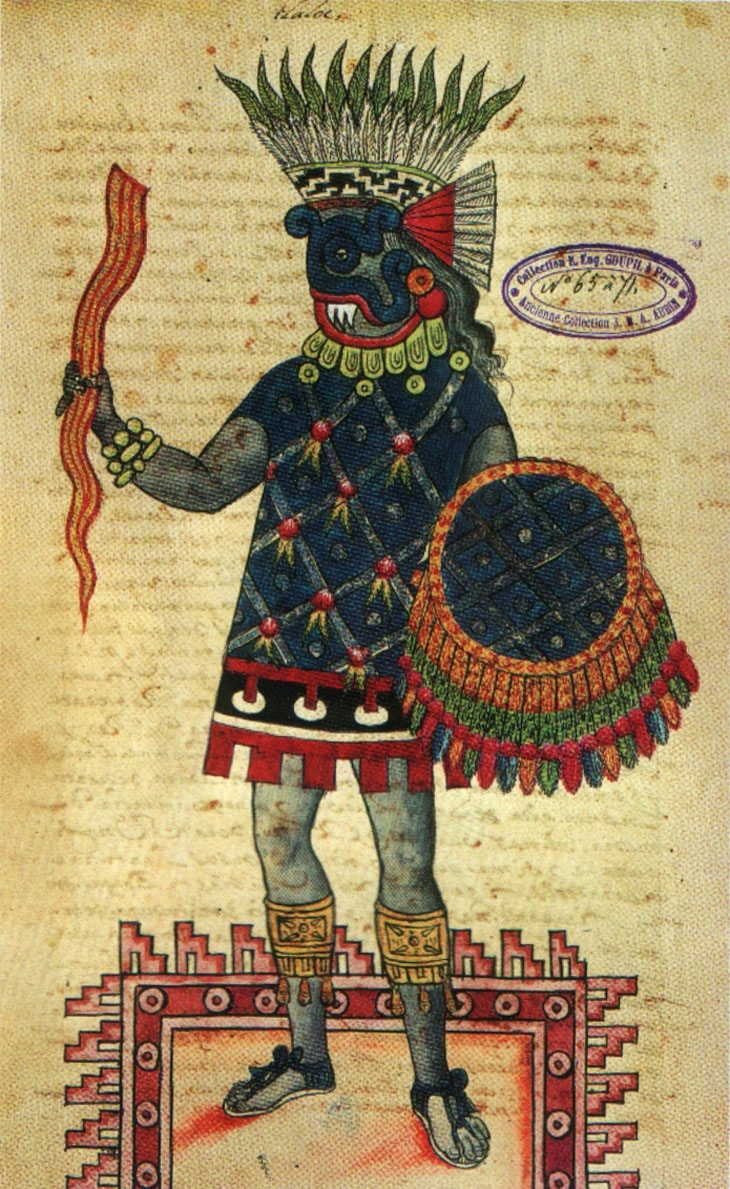
Tláloc, Collection E. Eug. Goupil, 17th century

The second shrine on top of the main pyramid at Tenochtitlan was dedicated to Tláloc. Both his shrine, and Huitzilopochtli's next to it, faced west. Sacrifices and rites took place in these temples. The Aztecs believed Tláloc resided in mountain caves, thus his shrine in Tenochtitlan's pyramid was called "mountain abode." Many rich offerings were regularly placed before it, especially those linked to water, such as shells, jade, and sand. Cerro Tláloc was situated directly east of the pyramid, which is very in-line with classic Aztec architecture. The Mexica did and designed everything with cosmological direction. It was forty-four miles away, with a long road connecting the two places of worship. On Cerro Tláloc, there was a shrine containing stone images of the mountain itself and other neighboring peaks. The shrine was called Tlálocan, in reference to the paradise. Also, the shrine contained four pitchers containing water. Each pitcher would produce a different fate if used on crops: the first would bring forth a good harvest, the second would cause the harvest to fail and rot, the third would dry the harvest out, and the final one would freeze it. Sacrifices that took place on Cerro Tláloc were thought to favor early rains.

The Atlcahualo festivals was celebrated from 12 February until 3 March. Dedicated to the Tlaloque, this veintena involved the sacrifice of children on sacred mountaintops, like Cerro Tláloc. This form of human sacrifice was not only specific, but necessary in the eyes of the Aztecs. The children were beautifully adorned, dressed in the style of Tláloc and the Tlaloque. The children were "chosen" by the community, and although this selection came with honor, being selected came with great responsibility. Furthermore, these children were not usually of high social class. The children to be sacrificed were carried to Cerro Tláloc on litters strewn with flowers and feathers, while also being surrounded by dancers. Once the children reached the peak, they would have to stay overnight with the priests at the vigil. The priests were not allowed to leave this site, or else they would be considered "mocauhque", meaning they who are abandoned. Then, at the shrine, the children's hearts would be pulled out by Aztec priests. If, on the way to the shrine, these children cried, their tears were viewed as positive signs of imminent and abundant rains. Every Atlcahualo festival, seven children were sacrificed in and around Lake Texcoco in the Aztec capital. The children were either slaves or the second-born children of noblepeople, or pīpiltin. If the children did not cry, it meant a bad year for their whole system of living - agriculture. To signify when the rains were about to end, the Aztecs relied on the call from a bird known as the "cuitlacochin". This would also signify a switch to soft rain rolling in.

The festival of Tozoztontli (24 March – 12 April) similarly involved child sacrifice. During this festival, the children were sacrificed in caves. The flayed skins of sacrificial victims that had been worn by priests for the last twenty days were taken off and placed in these dark caverns.

The winter veintena of Atemoztli (9 December – 28 December) was also dedicated to the Tlaloque. This period preceded an important rainy season, so statues were made out of amaranth dough. Their teeth were pumpkin seeds and their eyes, beans. Once these statues were offered copal, fine scents, and other food items, while they were also prayed to and adorned with finery. Afterwards, their doughy chests were opened, their "hearts" taken out, before their bodies were cut up and eaten. The ornaments with which they had been adorned were taken and burned in peoples’ patios. On the final day of the "veintena," people celebrated and held banquets.

Tláloc was also worshipped during the Huey Tozotli festival, which was celebrated annually. Evidence from the Codex Borbonicus suggests that Huey Tozotli was a commemoration of Centeotl, the god of maize. While Tláloc is not normally associated with Huey Tozotli, evidence from the Codex Borbonicus indicates that Tláloc was worshipped during this festival. Additional evidence from the Book of Gods and Rites suggest rulers from the Aztec Empire and other states would make a pilgrimage to Cerro Tláloc during the Huey Tozotli festival in order to present offerings to Tláloc. The Book of Gods and Rites also suggests that a child was sacrificed as a part of this pilgrimage as well, although this could simply be the result of colonial sensationalism on the part of the Spanish authors. It is argued that Tláloc was incorporated into celebrations of Huey Tozotli because of his role as the god of rain. Huey Tozotli was a celebration of the maize harvest, and it would make sense that worshippers might want to celebrate Tláloc during this festival as his powers of the rain would be critical to having a successful harvest of maize.

Tláloc was linked to the regenerative capacity of weather, and, as such, he was worshipped at Cerro Tláloc because much of the rain in Central Mexico is formed over range of which Cerro Tláloc is a part. Tláloc was worshipped on Cerro Tláloc during the Etzalcualiztli festival, in which rulers from across Central Mexico performed rituals to Tláloc in order to ask for rain, and to celebrate fertility and the change of the seasons. An important part of these pilgrimages to Cerro Tláloc during Etzalcualitztli was the sacrifice of both adults and children to Tláloc.

== Related deities ==
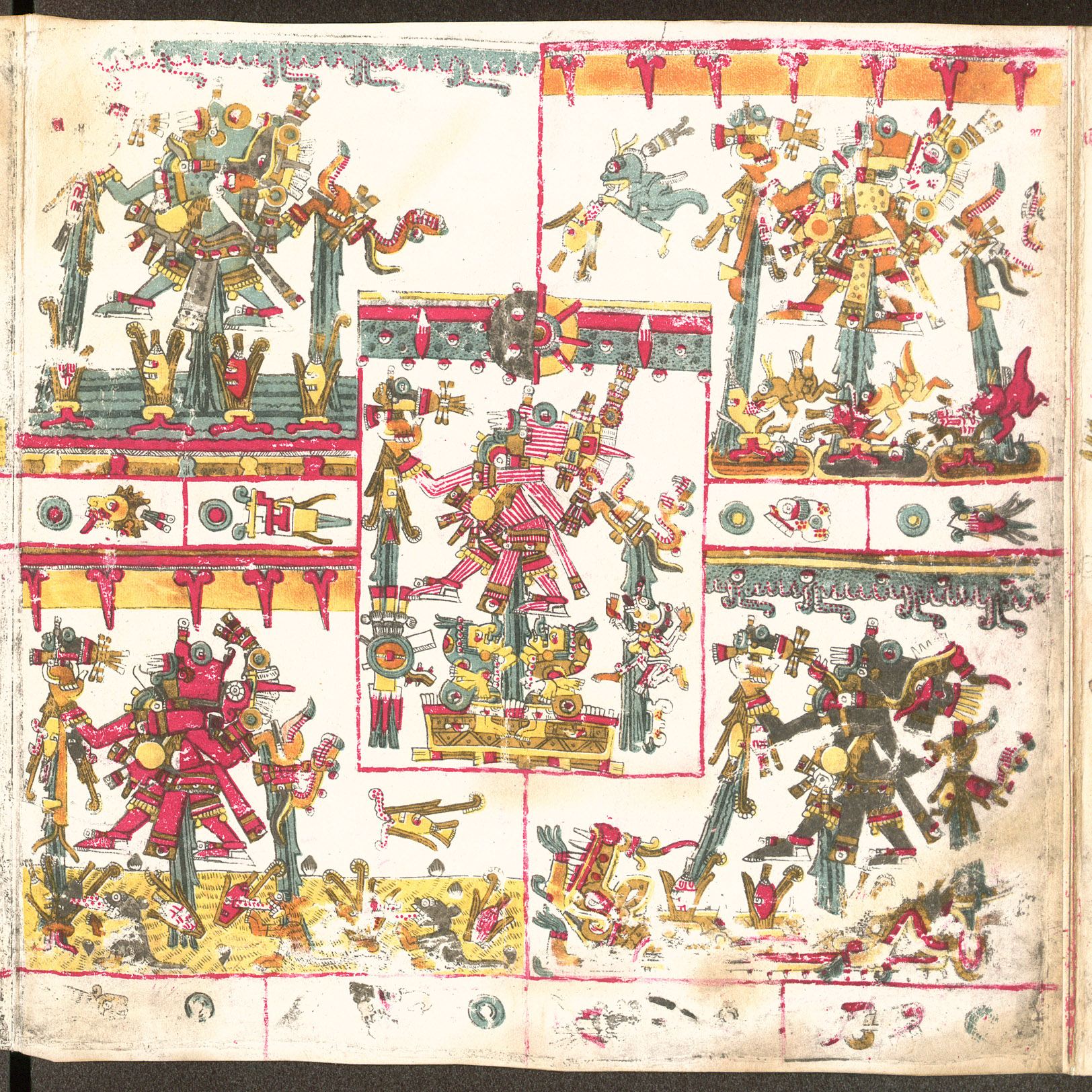
Five Tlaloquê depicted in the Codex Borgia.

Archaeological evidence indicates Tláloc was worshipped in Mesoamerica before the Aztecs even settled there in the 13th century AD. He was a prominent god in Teotihuacan at least 800 years before the Aztecs. This has led to Meso-American goggle-eyed rain gods being referred to generically as "Tláloc," although in some cases it is unknown what they were called in these cultures, and in other cases we know that he was called by a different name, e.g., the Maya version was known as Chaac and the Zapotec deity as Cocijo.

Chalchiuhtlicue, or "she of the jade skirt" in Nahuatl, was the deity connected with the worship of ground water. Therefore, her shrines were by springs, streams, irrigation ditches, or aqueducts, the most important of these shrines being at Pantitlan, in the center of Lake Texcoco. Sometimes described as Tláloc's sister, Chalchiuhtlicue was impersonated by ritual performers wearing the green skirt that was associated with Chalchiuhtlicue. Like that of Tláloc, her cult was linked to the earth, fertility and nature's regeneration.

Tláloc was first married to the goddess of flowers, Xochiquetzal, which literally translates to "Flower Quetzal." Xochiquetzal personifies pleasure, flowers, and young female sexuality. In doing so, she is associated with pregnancies and childbirths and was believed to act as a guardian figure for new mothers. Unlike many other female deities, Xochiquetzal maintains her youthful appearance and is often depicted in opulent attire and gold adornments.

Tláloc was the father of Tecciztecatl, possibly with Chalchiuhtlicue. Tláloc had an older sister or daughter named Huixtocihuatl. He is also possibly related to the goddess Ayauhteotl.

== Cerro Tláloc ==
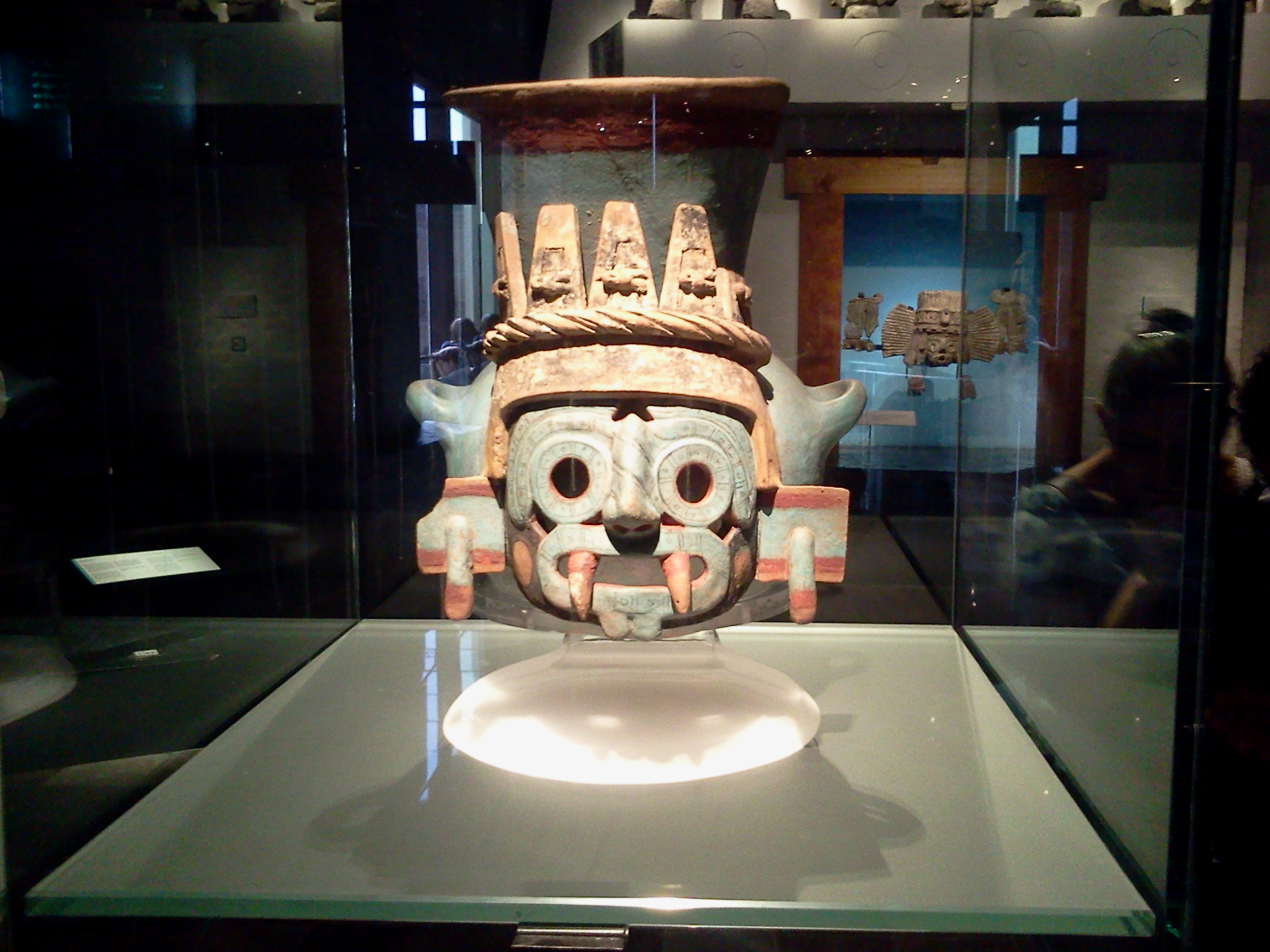
Tláloc effigy vessel; 1440–1469; painted earthenware; height: 35 cm (1 3/4 in.); Museo del Templo Mayor (Mexico City). One side of the Aztecs' great temple, the Templo Mayor, was dedicated to the storm god Tláloc, the pyramid-temple symbolizing his mountain-cave abode. This jar, covered with stucco and painted blue, is adorned with the visage of Tláloc, identified by his coloration, ringed eyes and jaguar teeth; the Aztecs likened the rumble of thunder to the feline's growl

There is a sanctuary found atop Cerro Tláloc, dedicated to the god, Tláloc; it is thought that the location of this sanctuary in relation to other temples surrounding it may have been a way for the Aztecs to mark the time of year and keep track of important ceremonial dates. Research has shown that different orientations linked to Cerro Tláloc revealed a grouping of dates at the end of April and beginning of May associated with certain astronomical and meteorological events. Archaeological, ethnohistoric, and ethnographic data indicate that these phenomena coincide with the sowing of maize in dry lands associated with agricultural sites. The precinct on the summit of the mountain contains 5 stones which are thought to represent Tláloc and his four Tlaloque, who are responsible for providing rain for the land. It also features a structure that housed a statue of Tláloc in addition to idols of many different religious regions, such as the other sacred mountains.

=== Geographical setting ===
Cerro Tláloc is the highest peak of the part of the Sierra Nevada called Sierra del Rio Frio that separates the valleys of Mexico and Puebla. It rises over two different ecological zones: alpine meadows and subalpine forests. The rainy season starts in May and lasts until October. The highest annual temperature occurs in April, the onset of the rainy season, and the lowest in December–January. Some 500 years ago weather conditions were slightly more severe, but the best time to climb the mountain was practically the same as today: October through December, and February until the beginning of May. The date of the feast of Huey Tozotli celebrated atop Cerro Tláloc coincided with a period of the highest annual temperature, shortly before dangerous thunderstorms might block access to the summit.

=== Archaeological evidence ===
The first detailed account of Cerro Tláloc by Jim Rickards in 1929 was followed by visits or descriptions by other scholars. In 1953 Wicke and Horcasitas carried out preliminary archaeological investigations at the site; their conclusions were repeated by Parsons in 1971. Archaeo-astronomical research began in 1984, some of which remains unpublished. In 1989 excavation was undertaken at the site by Solis and Townsend. The current damage that is present at the top of Cerro Tláloc is thought to be likely of human destruction, rather than natural forces. There also appears to have been a construction of a modern shrine that was built in the 1970s, which suggests that there was a recent/present attempt to conduct rituals on the mountain top.

== See also ==
- Aktzin
- Cocijo
- Chaac
- Cerro Tláloc
- Tlaloque
