= Tonal (mythology) =

Concept in Mesoamerican religion

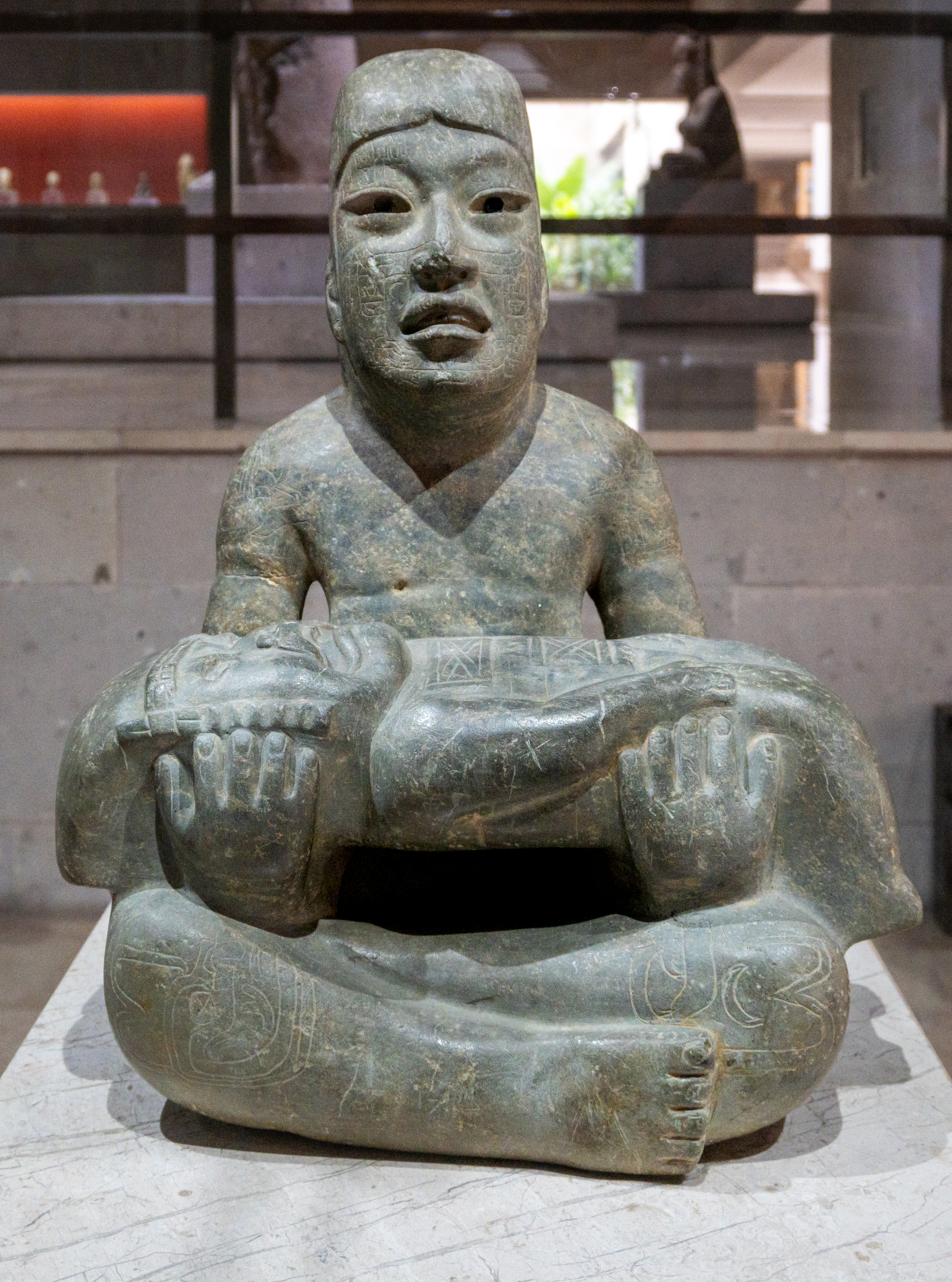
Sculpture known as “Señor de Las Limas”, Archaeological Museum of Xalapa, Veracruz, Mexico

Tonal is a concept within the study of Mesoamerican religion, cosmology, folklore, and anthropology. It is a belief found in many indigenous Mesoamerican cultures that a person upon being born acquires a close spiritual link to an animal, a link that lasts throughout the lives of both creatures. The person shows signs of whatever the animal's situation, to include scratches and bruises if the animal gets in fights, or illness if the animal is ill. It is in this way similar to the concept of totem.

== Etymology ==
The word comes from the Nahuatl word tonalli, meaning "day" or "daysign". In the Aztec belief system, the day of a person's birth calculated in the tōnalpōhualli would determine the nature of the person – each day was associated with an animal which could have a strong or weak aspect. The person born on the day of for example "the dog" would then have the strong or weak aspect of the dog. In Nahuatl, the word Tonalli was used to refer both to a day and to the animal related to that day. In Mayan belief, the concept of an animal companion of a person was referred to as "Way". The modern Mixe people refer to it as Ts'ok. The Jakaltek Maya people of Concepcion Huista, Guatemala call it yixomal ispiẍan nax, meaning "soul bearer".

== Studies ==
The study of tonalism was initiated by archaeologist, linguist, and ethnologist Daniel Garrison Brinton who published a treatise called "Nagualism: A Study in Native-American Folklore and History" which chronicled historical interpretations of the word and those who practiced nagualism in Mexico in 1894. He identified the different beliefs associated with tonalism in some modern Mexican communities such as the Mixe, the Nahuas, the Zapotecs, and Mixtecs. Precursors of these practices extend to ancient indigenous civilizations such as Nahua, Olmec, and Toltec civilizations.

== See also ==
- Wayob
