= Chorotega =

Chorotega may refer to:

- Chorotega language, an extinct Oto-Manguean language indigenous to Honduras, El Salvador, Costa Rica and Nicaragua
- Chorotega people, the ethnicity that formerly spoke the language
- Chorotega (wasp), an insect genus in the subfamily Encyrtinae
