= Quiateot =

Mesoamerican-Nahuan deity of the Nicarao people

Quiateot is the name of a rain deity in the mythological traditions of the pre-Columbian and contact-era Nicarao people, an Indigenous grouping on the periphery of the Mesoamerican cultural area, located in present-day Nicaragua.

His father and mother are the supreme deities Omeyateite (Ometeotl) and Omeyatecigoat (Omecihuatl), respectively.
