= Tonalli =

Mesoamerican religious concept

Tonalli (see also: Tonal) is a Mesoamerican religious concept which can designate a day sign, body part, and a symbol of the sun's warmth. Ancient Nahua people believed that it was located in the hair and the fontanel area of one's skull, and that the tonalli provided the “vigor and energy for growth and development”. It often overlaps with the force of teyolía which was often considered both an animating force (soul) and the physical heart in various Mesoamerican cultures.

== Etymology ==
The root “tona” acts as a verb to mean "to irradiate or make warm with sun”.

== Mythology ==
In the Ancient Nahua belief, the tonalli is bestowed upon a child in utero by the aged deities known as Ometecuhtli and Omecihuatl, or the “Lord and Lady of Duality”. The implementation of tonalli is conducted through a process known as Fire Drilling.

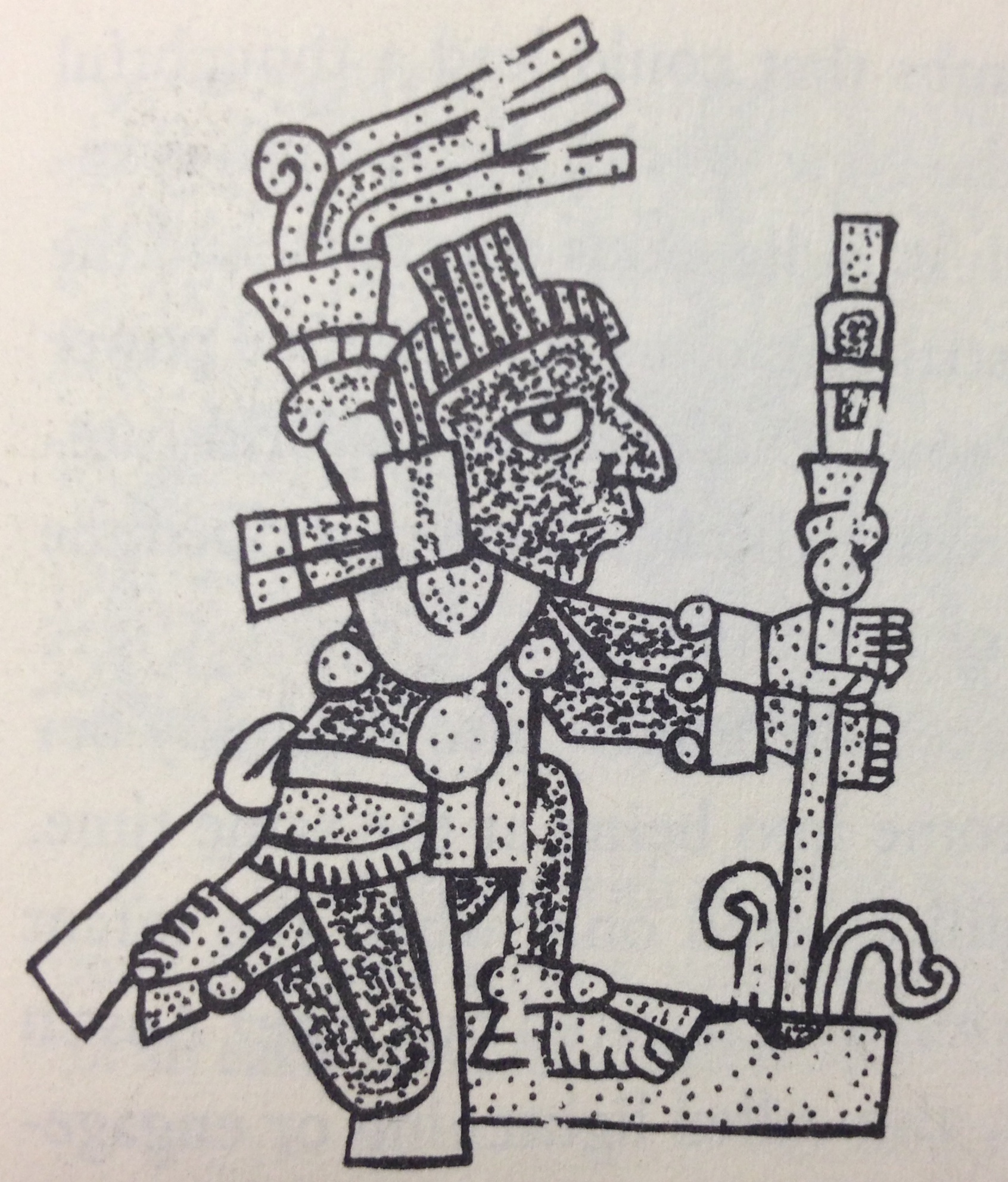
Drilling with a stick on an upright base to make smoke and fire. Post classic Mixtec, Oaxaca

It is believed that the old deities, Ometecuhtli and Omecihuatl transferred tonalli to human fetuses by “simultaneously breath[ing] the tonalli into the child and ignit[ing] a fire in its chest”. This Fire Drilling process involves an upright wooden piece being twirled rapidly on a flat base. It produces heat through friction, although this seemingly simple instrument requires considerable skill to make anything but smoke. The fire maker blows on an ignited spark to fan it into a vigorous flame, and the breathing (or blowing air) and friction in the chest animate an infant. The Franciscan friars connected this idea of Fire Drilling, namely, the conception of tonalli as breath, to Christianity as the infusion of breath into the body recalls the beginning of Genesis, where God the Father breathes life into Adam.

== The human body ==
The Nahua people of Mesoamerica believed that the soul comprised three entities: Tonalli, Teyolía, and Ihíyotl, three souls in the body. Tonalli is located in fontanel area of the skull. Teyolía is located in the heart and Ihíyotl is in the liver. Each of these souls has its own functions and protective deities. But there are important differences. The Tonalli is the soul that enters and leaves the body. In Atla in the northern Sierra de Puebla, the inhabitants believe this is the soul that travels while you sleep at night, and then comes back. This is the soul that leaves and comes back every time you sneeze, or whenever you yawn, or even when you are startled. The Nahua believed that it was not good to sneeze and keep talking, because it causes your tonalli to leave and once your Tonalli leaves, you have to wait for a period of time before it returns. At that moment, anything can enter your body. However, the soul of the heart (Teyolía) and the soul of the liver (Ihiíyotl) only leave your body when you die; those two souls will exit only at the exact moment of your death.

=== Tonalli in the blood ===
Along with the heart, the ancient Mexica took blood from sacrificed prisoners and offered its fructifying force to the gods. On public and private ritual occasions, people drew blood from their ears, tongues, or calves, splattered it on pieces of paper, and gave it to the spirits as tokens of thanks for benefits received or as requests for future favors. The gods could be coaxed or rewarded, less by the physical fluid itself than by the tonalli (life force) it carried and transferred to them. Among most modern Nahuatl speakers, the state of the life force may even be determined from the movement of blood in the body, whether this movement is experienced as a tic, a pulse, or a muscular movement.

== Ritual ==
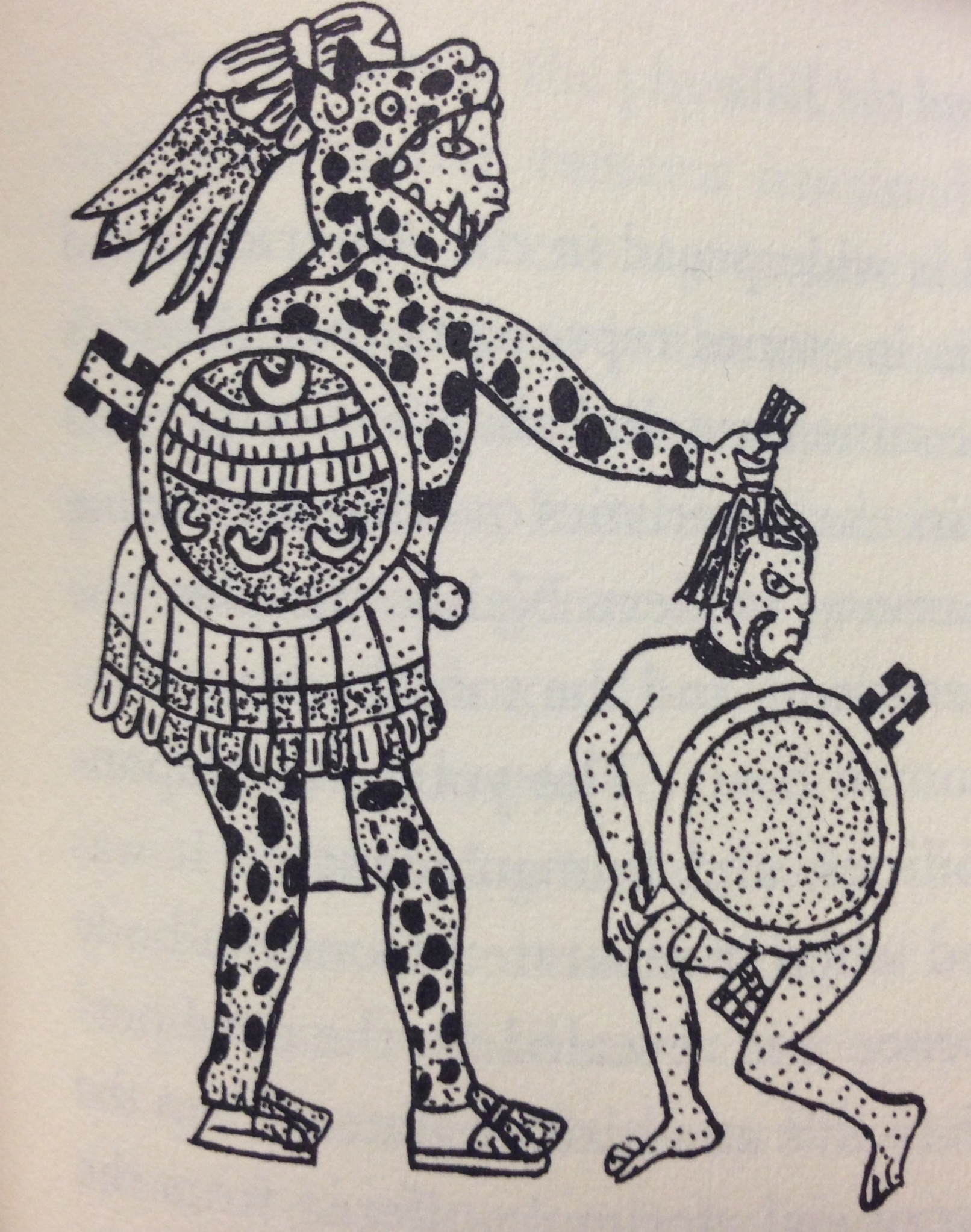
Warrior who has taken a captive by the hair. This is a symbolic representation of seizing the captive's tonalli. Early colonial Central Mexico.

=== War and human sacrifice ===
Tonalli was highly valued in society and sought after in warfare and ritual sacrifice. The hair that covered the head, especially the fontanel area, was a major receptacle of tonalli, and it was believed that hair prevented the tonalli from leaving the body. During times of war, when a warrior would take a prisoner captive, the warrior would often seize the captive by the hair (the fontanel area). It was believed that the fortitude and valor of a warrior resided, in part, in the hair, and there are many pictorial scenes showing Aztec warriors grabbing the hair of enemies. The hair of warriors captured in battle was kept by the captors in order to increase their tonalli. The severed heads of enemy warriors were a supreme prize for the city, which gained more tonalli through the ceremonial use of heads. The tonalli embedded within skulls of enemy warriors and captives were also offered as gifts to the gods in the temple complexes. This was believed to be an offering to the gods in the form of a type of debt repayment.

=== Social practices ===
The essence of tonalli was a force that could transcend the limits of the human body. Parts of the tonalli could reside outside the body in objects and animals. For example, tlacopatli beads were often left in the temple and represented a substitute for a child unable to go to the temple school, due to age restrictions. These beads served to contain the tonalli and do penitence for the underaged child. This points to the belief of the physicality of the soul and the embodiment of the tonalli. Stones were also used as repositories of the soul in a different sense. As tonalli was considered to be an indication of destiny or fate, the possession of gemstones served as direct evidence of those with positive fates despite low births and the auspicious destinies of members of the elite class.

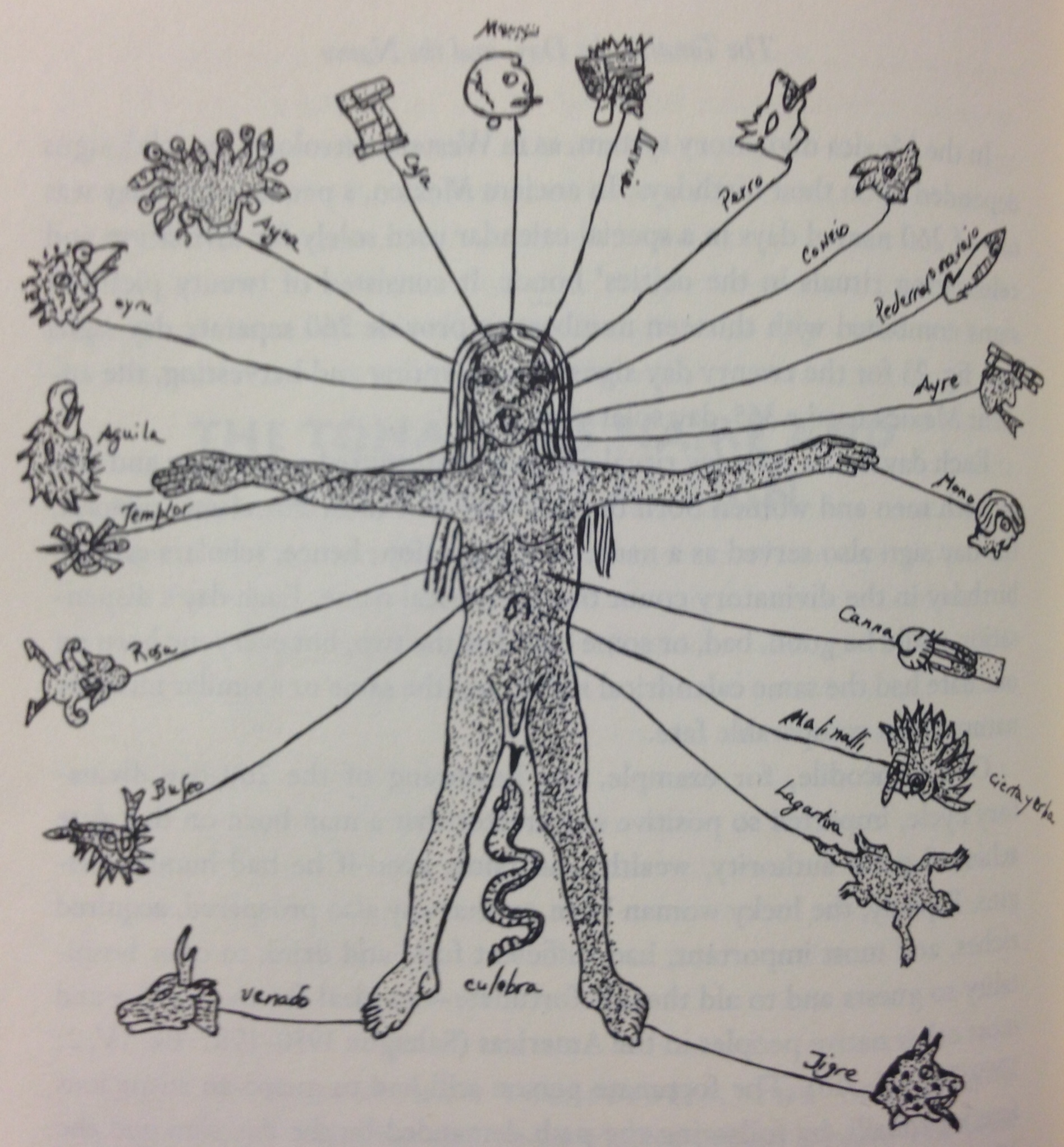
Figure with 20 day signs of ancient Mexica attached to parts of the body in place of the astrological signs assigned to them in Europe.

== Tonalli co-essences ==
The tonalli operated within a complex that involved the god of the birth date and the human. The soul of the individuality of a person, resided inside; but the god of the tonalli resided outside The co-essence of tonalli in a human body is subject to the power of an external god/time that could lodge in a person's body. The dynamics of this joint essence relationship made it necessary for humans to implore each god of birth dates for internal strength, health and good fortune.

== Animating quality of tonalli ==
Tonalli, along with teyolia and ihiyotl, was believed to direct the physiological process of the human body. It gave a person character, and was highly valued by the family and sought after in warfare and ritual sacrifice. It was believed that tonalli could be taken from a human body and either offered to the gods as a form of debt payment or acquired by the ritual person who touched the physical entity in which they resided. The concept of tonalli was not only limited to human beings. It infiltrated animals, gods, plants, and objects used in rituals.

=== Astrological signs ===
The tonalli also determines the sign under which a person is born and informs fortune, character, and name. Tonalli conveyed astrological signs and names through birthdays, and in the Mexica divinatory system, a person's birthday fell on one of the 260 name days in a special calendar. Individuals followed the path or code of conduct demanded by the tonalli and the day sign. This calendar was notable because it was used solely for divination and celebrating rituals in the deities’ honor. The calendrical name of a given person transmitted a character and fate to both men and women. A person born on the first day of the 260-day cycle, would be named One Crocodile and was given a positive character that would bring about authority, wealth, and fame. Inauspicious day signs could be ameliorated through rituals such as first baths, and life events.

== Free will ==
It was believed that individuals possess free will within the constraints imposed by their tonalli. One is born with either favorable or unfavorable tonalli and with a corresponding predetermined character. While this places certain constraints upon what one may accomplish, one freely chooses what to make of one's tonalli within these limits. Someone born with favorable tonalli may squander it through improper action; someone with unfavorable tonalli may neutralize its adverse effects through knowledge of the sacred calendar and careful selection of actions.

== Soul loss ==
As an animating force within both the human and spiritual world, retaining tonalli provides consciousness and personality. The concept of soul loss was inherent to the ancient Central Mexican understanding of aging and death. The loss of tonalli, in its various stages, is known by states in which the person suffers slowed, impaired, or complete loss of consciousness. As the understanding of tonalli is reliant upon conceptions of warmth, heat, and the sun, the absence of tonalli is felt as fluctuations in internal temperature. The inability to re-implant the life force leads to a decline in health and ultimately death. The modern Nahua and the Mexica have identified the tonalli's departure as the cause of illnesses with the same general and observable symptoms as death and dying.

== See also ==
- Teyolía
- Ihíyotl
