= Mesoamerican calendars =

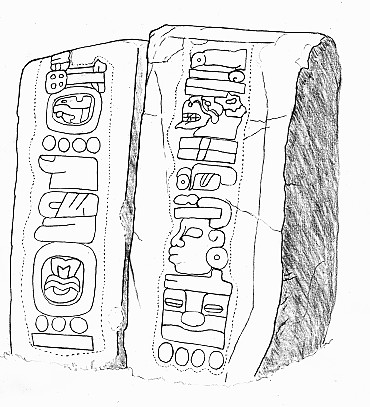
Stelae 12 and 13 from Monte Albán, provisionally dated to 500-400 BCE, showing what is thought to be one of the earliest calendric representations in Mesoamerica.

The calendrical systems devised and used by the pre-Columbian cultures of Mesoamerica, primarily a 260-day year, were used in religious observances and social rituals, such as divination. The importance of aboriginal calendars in ritual and other aspects of Mesoamerican life was noted by many missionary priests, travelers, and colonial administrators, and later by ethnographers who described and recorded the cultures of contemporary Mesoamerican ethnic groups. These calendars have been dated to early as ca. 1100 BCE. By 500 BCE at the latest, the essentials were fully defined and functional.

260-day calendars are still used in the Guatemalan highlands, Veracruz, Oaxaca and Chiapas, Mexico. Ethnologists have documented modern 365-day agricultural calendars of the Mesoamerican form in Totonac, Chinantec, Mazatec, Mixe, and Chiapanec communities, though in many cases, the exact day and month names vary slightly from community to community due to dialectal differences.

== Types of calendars ==
Among the various calendar systems in use, two were particularly central and widespread across Mesoamerica. Common to all recorded Mesoamerican cultures, and the most important, was the 260-day calendar, a ritual calendar with no confirmed correlation to astronomical or agricultural cycles. Apparently the earliest Mesoamerican calendar to be developed was known by a variety of local terms, and its named components and the glyphs used to depict them were culture-specific. However, it is clear that type of calendar functioned in essentially the same way across cultures, and across the chronological periods when it was maintained.

The second of the major calendars was one representing a 365-day period approximating the tropical year, known sometimes as the "vague year". Because it was an approximation, over time the seasons and the true tropical year gradually "wandered" with respect to this calendar, owing to the accumulation of the differences in length. There is little hard evidence to suggest that the ancient Mesoamericans used any intercalary days to bring their calendar back into alignment. However, there is evidence to show Mesoamericans were aware of this gradual shifting, which they accounted for in other ways without amending the calendar itself.

These two 260- and 365-day calendars could also be synchronised to generate the Calendar Round, a period of 18980 days or approximately 52 years. The completion and observance of this Calendar Round sequence was of ritual significance to a number of Mesoamerican cultures.

A third major calendar form known as the Long Count is found in the inscriptions of several Mesoamerican cultures, most famously those of the Maya civilization who developed it to its fullest extent during the Classic period (ca. 200–900 CE). The Long Count provided the ability to uniquely identify days over a much longer period of time, by combining a sequence of day-counts or cycles of increasing length, calculated or set from a particular date in the mythical past. Most commonly, five such higher-order cycles in a modified vigesimal (base-20) count were used.

The use of Mesoamerican calendrics is one of the cultural traits that Paul Kirchhoff used in his original formulation to define Mesoamerica as a culture area. Therefore, the use of Mesoamerican calendars is specific to Mesoamerica and is not found outside its boundaries.

Since the sixteenth century, most communities have lost both of these once universal calendars, but one—or, rarely, both—has survived in diverse linguistic groups through the twentieth century.

== Ritual 260-day calendar ==
In the 260-day cycle 20 day names pairs with 13 day numbers, totaling a cycle of 260 days. This cycle was used for divination purposes to foretell lucky and unlucky days. The date of birth was also used to give names to both humans and gods in many Mesoamerican cultures; some cultures used only the calendar name whereas others combined it with a given name. As a result, the word for "day" also means "name" in some Mesoamerican languages. Each day sign was presided over by a god and many had associations with specific natural phenomena.

The 260-day calendar was called piye among the Zapotecs, may among the Zoque, xëë tun ("path of the sun") or xëë too ("path of the days") among the Mixe, and nombomomo among the Chiapanecs.

=== History ===
Earliest written evidence for the 260 calendar include the San Andres glyphs (Olmec, 650 BCE, giving the possible date 3 Ajaw) and the San Jose Mogote danzante (Zapotec, 600 - 500 BCE, giving the possible date 1 Earthquake), in both cases assumed to be used as names. However, the earliest evidence of the use of the 260-day cycle comes from astronomical alignments in the Olmec region and western Maya Lowlands, dating to about 1100 BCE.

The exact origin of the 260-day count is not known, but there are several theories. One theory is that the calendar came from mathematical operations based on the numbers thirteen and twenty, which were important numbers to the Maya. The numbers multiplied together equal 260.

Another theory is that the 260-day period came from the length of human pregnancy. This is close to the average number of days between the first missed menstrual period and birth, unlike Naegele's rule which is 40 weeks (280 days) between the last menstrual period and birth. It is postulated that midwives originally developed the calendar to predict babies' expected birth dates.

A third theory comes from understanding of astronomy, geography and paleontology. The Mesoamerican calendar probably originated with the Olmecs, and a settlement existed at Izapa, in southeast Chiapas, Mexico, before 1200 BCE. There, at a latitude of about 15° N, the Sun passes through zenith twice a year, and there are 260 days between zenithal passages, and gnomons (used generally for observing the path of the Sun and in particular zenithal passages), were found at this and other sites. The sacred almanac may well have been set in motion on August 13, 1359, BCE, in Izapa.

=== Trecenas ===
In the post-classic Aztec calendar the periods of 13 days called a trecena in Spanish (no indigenous word for this period is known) were also important. The days of a trecena were usually numbered from 1 to 13. There were some exceptions, such as in the Tlapanec area where they were counted from 2 to 14. The first day of the trecena, and the god who was its patron, ruled the following thirteen days. If the first day of a trecena was auspicious then so were the next twelve days.

== 365-day calendar ==
This 365-day calendar corresponded was divided into 18 'months' of 20 days each, plus 5 'nameless' days at the end of the year. The 365 day year had no leap year so it varied from the solar year by a quarter of a day each year. The years were given their name in much the same way as the days of the 260-day calendar, 20 names were paired with 18 numbers giving 360 different possibilities for year names. The 365-day calendar was called yza among the Zapotecs, cuiya among the Mixtecs, huriyata miucua among the Purépecha, hame among the Zoque, and nbotihmo among the Chiapanecs.

=== Veintenas ===
In the post-classic Aztec calendar the 20 days called veintenas in Spanish and meztli, meaning moon, in Nahuatl, were also important.

=== The five unlucky days ===
The five unlucky days were called nemontemi in Mexico. Most believe them to have come at the end of each year, but since we do not know when the year started, we cannot know for sure. We do know though, that in the Maya area these five days (called wayeb in Maya) were always the last days of the year.

The nemontemi were seen as 'the useless days' or the days that were dedicated to no gods, and they had prognostic power for the coming year. Therefore, people tried to do as little as possible on these days, and a person who was born during the nemontemi was considered unlucky.

== Calendar Round ==
Since both the 260-day and the 365-day calendar repeat, approximately every 52 years they reach a common end, and a new Calendar Round begins. This 52-year cycle was the most important for most Mesoamericans, with the apparent exception of the Maya elite until the end of the Classic Era, who gave equal importance to the long count calendar. According to their mythology, at the end of one of these 52-year cycles the world would be destroyed by the gods, as it had been, three times in the Popul Vuh and four times for the Aztecs. While waiting for this to happen, all fire was extinguished, utensils were destroyed to symbolize new beginnings, people fasted and rituals were carried out. This was known as the New Fire Ceremony. When dawn broke on the first day of the new cycle, torches were lit in the temples and brought out to light new fires everywhere, and ceremonies of thanksgiving were performed.

== Calendar Wheels ==
The term calendar wheel generally refers to Colonial-period images that display cycles of time in a circular format. Central Mexican calendar wheels incorporate the eighteen annual festivals or the 52-year cycle. In the Maya area, calendar wheels depict a cycle of 13 K'atuns. The only known pre-Hispanic K'atuns wheel appears on a stone turtle from Mayapán.

The earliest known Colonial-period calendar wheel is actually depicted in a square format, on pages 21 and 22 of the Codex Borbonicus, an Aztec screenfold that divides the 52-year cycle into two parts. The Codex Aubin, also known as the Codex of 1576, shows the 52-year calendar in a rectangular format on a single page. Most other calendar wheels use a circular format. The Boban calendar wheel, an early sixteenth-century calendar on native paper, depicts the Central Mexican cycle of eighteen festivals in clockwise rotation, with Arabic numerals used to total the number of days; virtually all the text is in Nahuatl. Some paired festivals share the same glyph, but they are represented in different sizes, the first being the "small feast" and the second the "great feast." In the center, a 7 Rabbit date (1538) appears with text and images that refer to Tetzcocan town officers.

== Religion and calendrics ==
=== Lords of the day ===
In the post-classic Aztec calendar, there were 13 Lords of the Day. These were gods (and goddesses) who each represented one of the 13 days in the trecenas of the 260-day calendar. The same god always represented the same day. Quetzalcohuatl (The feathered serpent), for example, always accompanied the 9th day.

=== Lords of the Night ===
There are only nine Lords of the Night, which means that they cannot always represent the same day, but the list of gods repeats itself again and again so each lord accompanies a new number each trecena. Some think that there are nine Lords of the Night because they are connected to the nine levels of the underworld.

== Long Count ==
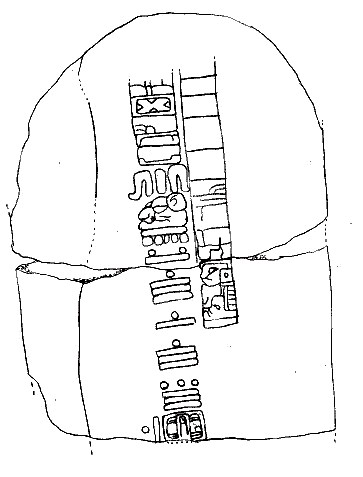
The back of Stela C from Tres Zapotes, an Olmec archaeological site. This is the second oldest Long Count date yet discovered. The numerals 7.16.6.16.18 translate to September 1, 32 BCE (Gregorian). The glyphs surrounding the date are what is thought to be one of the few surviving examples of Epi-Olmec script.

The 365-day and the 260-day calendars identified and named the days, but not the years. The combination of a solar year date and a 260-year date was enough to identify a specific date to most people's satisfaction, as such a combination did not occur again for another 52 years, above general life expectancy. To measure dates over periods longer than 52 years, the Mesoamericans devised the Long Count calendar. This calendar system was probably developed by the Olmecs and later adopted by the Maya. The use of the long count is best attested among the classic Maya, it is not known to have been used by the central Mexican cultures.

The Long Count calendar identifies a date by counting the number of days from August 11, 3114 BCE in the proleptic Gregorian calendar or September 6, 3114 BCE in the Julian Calendar (-3113 astronomical). The Long Count days were tallied in a modified base-20 scheme. Thus 0.0.0.1.5 is equal to 25, and 0.0.0.2.0 is equal to 40.

== Correlations ==
=== Long count ===
The correlation is based on historical, archaeological and astronomical evidence.

The commonly established way of expressing the correlation between the Maya calendar and the western calendars is to provide number of days from the start of the Julian Period (Monday, January 1, 4713 BCE) to the start of creation on 13.0.0.0.0 4 Ajaw, 8 Kumk'u.

The most commonly accepted correlation is the "Goodman, Martinez, Thompson" correlation (GMT correlation). The GMT correlation establishes that the creation date occurred on September 6 (Julian) or August 11 (Gregorian), 3114 BC (-3113 astronomical), Julian day number (JDN) 584283.

== Maya Calendar ==
The Maya version of the 260-day calendar is commonly known to scholars as the Tzolkin, or Tzolk'in in the revised orthography of the Academia de Lenguas Mayas de Guatemala. The Tzolk'in is combined with the 365-day calendar (known as the Haab, or Haab' ), to form a synchronized cycle lasting for 52 Haabs, called the Calendar Round. The Maya called the 5 unlucky days at the end of the year Wayeb.

The Classic Maya, used the Long Count to record dates within periods longer than the 52 year calendar round. The post-Classic Maya used an abbreviated short count. Many Maya Long Count inscriptions also have a supplementary series which can record which one of the nine Lords of the Night rules, a Lunar series which has information about the lunar cycle, such as lunar phase and position of the Moon in a six lunation cycle and length of the current lunation and an 819-day count.

== Central Mexican Calendar ==
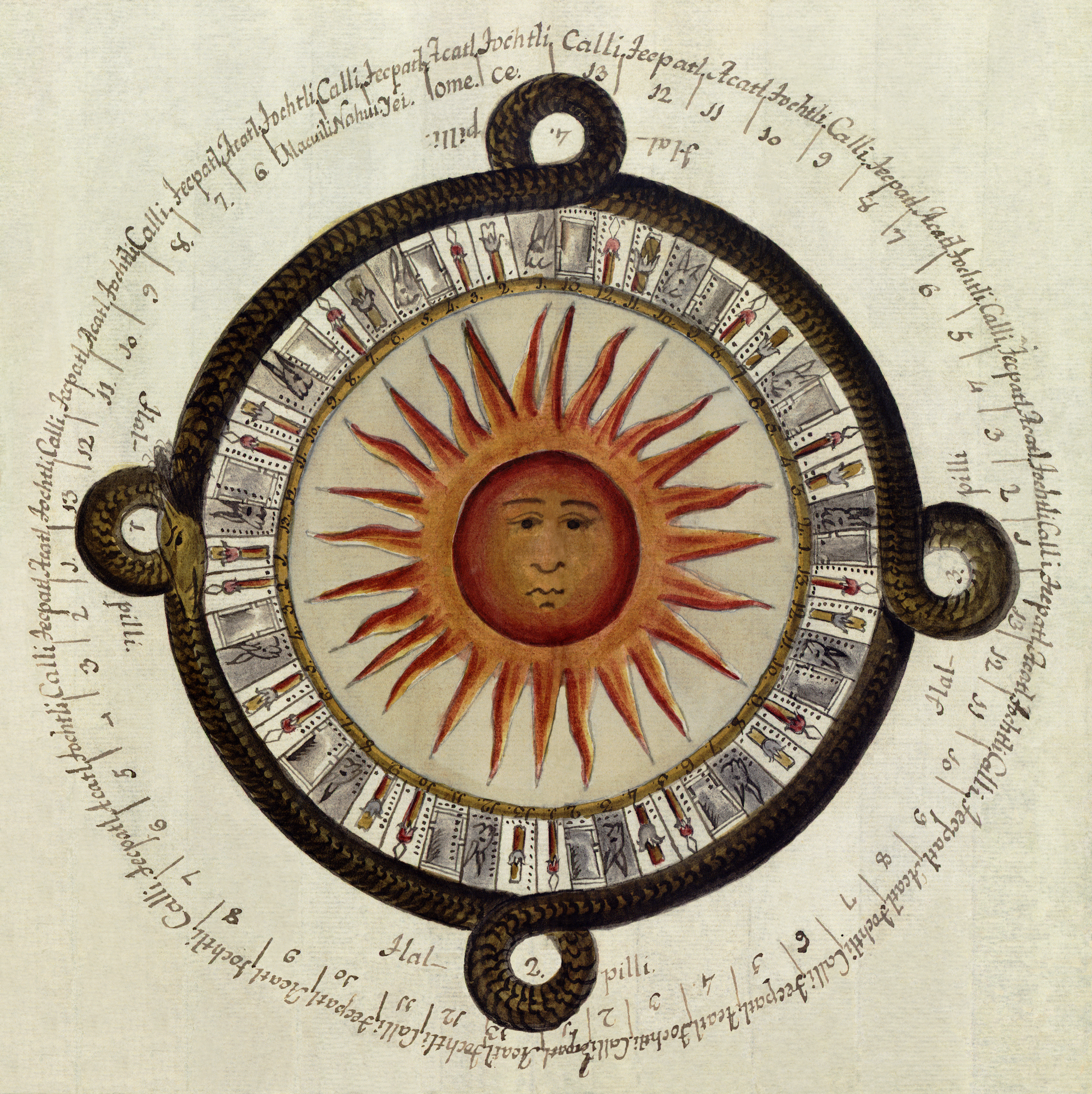
Image of a colonial era Mexican calendar

The Central Mexican calendar system is best known in the form that was used by the Aztecs, but similar calendars were used by the Nahuas of Puebla, Veracruz and Central America (the Pipil and Nicarao), the Mixtecs, Zapotecs, Tlapanecs, Otomi, Matlatzinca, Totonac, Huastecs, Purépecha, Cuicatecs, Mazatecs, Popoloca and at Teotihuacan, Monte Alban and El Tajin. These calendars differed from the Maya version mainly in that they didn't use the long count to fix dates into a larger chronological frame than the 52-year cycle.

The Aztecs referred to the 365 and 260-day cycles as xiuhpohualli (year count) and tonalpohualli (day count) respectively. The veintena was called metztli (moon), and the five unlucky days at the end of the solar year were called nemontemi.

== Other cycles ==
Other calendar cycles were also recorded, such as a lunar calendar, as well as the cycles of other astronomical objects, most importantly Venus.

== Comparison of calendars by culture ==
=== Day signs ===
Nahuatl	Mixtec	Zapotec (Note: Many of the Zapotec days whose meanings diverge from the Nahuatl names were nonetheless written with glyphs resembling the Nahuatl meanings.)	Otomi	Totonac	Mixe (Note: Names vary according to individual community; this list represents the version from Poxoyëm, a small Mixe community situated near Hidalgo Yalalag.)	Matlatzinca	Chiapanec
Cipactli "Alligator"	Quehui "Day"	Chilla "Alligator"	Antoqhuay "Stone Knife"	Lho'cxmul	Tëjk "House"	In Beori "Long"? (Note: Kaufman considers this translation unlikely.)	Tihu "Wind"
Ehecatl "Wind"	Chi "Wind"	Laa "Lightning"	Amadähi "Wind"	Yūn "Wind"	Xa(a)w	In Ithaati(n) "Wind"? (Note: Kaufman suggests this is a loanword from Mixtec.)	Nehelí "Liana"
Calli "House"	Cuau "Night", Huahi "House"	Lalaa "Night"	Anegü "House"	Chicla	Jow "Ripe"	In Bani "House"	Ñanyhito
Cuetzpalin "Lizard"	Quu "Bush"	Lachi "Ballgame"	Anbotäga "Black Lizard"	Tāxo	Jöö'n "Hard"	In Xichari "Jilote/Corn Husk"?	Nyhuhú "Lunar"
Coatl "Serpent"	Yo, Coo, Yucoco "Serpent"	Zee "Bad Omen"?	Ancquëyä "Serpent"	Lūhua' "Serpent"	Tsaan "Serpent"	In Chini "Serpent"	Mahuití
Miquiztli "Death"	Moku, Mahu	Lana "Smell of Meat"	Antu "Death"	Nīnīn "Death"	Oj	In Rini "Flesh/Head"?	Nimbu "Water"
Mazatl "Deer"	Cuaa, Cuav "Deer"	China "Deer"	Anphani "Deer"	Jūqui' "Deer"	Naj	In Pari "Deer"	Niimbi "Maguey"
Tochtli "Rabbit"	Sayu, Xay "Phallus"	Lapa	Anqhua "Rabbit"	Scauj "Rabbit"	Wiptsy	In Chon "Rabbit"	Ndirimbu
Atl "Water"	Cuta, Duta "Water"	Niça "Water"	Andehe "Water"	Chu'chut "Water"	Nëën (possibly "water" or "river")	In Thahui "Water"	Nuulú "Snake"
Itzcuintli "Dog"	Ua, Huaa "Dog; Noisy"	Tella "Knot"	Anyoh "Dog"	Chichi' "Dog"	Jo'	In Tzini "Dog"	Norimbulá
Ozomatli "Monkey"	Ñuu, Ñooy, Ñao	Loo "Monkey"	Amatzupâ "Monkey"	Stajku	Jëm "Flammable"	In Tzonyabi "Monkey"	Niiño "Fire"
Malinalli "Grass/Twisted"	Cuañe, Cuuñi "Twist"	Piya "Soap Plant"	Anchäxttey "Grass"	Tāskō'	Tëëts "Tooth"	In Tzinbi "Tooth"	Nuuyí "Reed"
Acatl "Reed"	Huiyo, Huiya "Reed"	Laa [Quiy] "Reed"	Anxithi "Reed"	Kā'tīt "Reed"	Käp "Reed"	In Thihui "Reed"	Nuuca "Stone"
Ocelotl "Jaguar"	Vidzu "Jaguar"	Lache "Heart"?	Anhmatzhäni "Jaguar"	Nisin "Jaguar"	Kaa "Cow/Bull" (Note: This word has the meaning of "jaguar" and "tiger" in some Mixe communities, and in others is the root used to form the words for the same.)	In Ixotzini "Image/Figure"	Numbú "Jaguar"
Cuauhtli "Eagle"	Xa, Sayacu "Hawk"	Naa "Cornfield"	Angaxuni "Eagle"	Pichahua' "Eagle"	Ju'uk "Tobacco"	In Chini "Eagle"	Sanyheme "Lord"
Cozcacuauhtli "Buzzard"	Cuij "Turkey; Buzzard"	Loo "Eye"	Mathucha	Ta'jna' "Turkey"	Pa(ö)w	In Yabin "Day/Sun/Time"	Na'nbulá "Earth"
Ollin "Movement"	Qhi	Xoo "Earthquake"	Anquitzhëy "Rubber Ball"	Qui-Dios cā'/Ka Molok "Our God" (Note: Dios is a Spanish word, and thus the prehispanic day sign must have been different.)	Ojx "Earthquake"	In Thaniri "Earthquake"	Nuuli "Petate"
Tecpatl "Flint Knife"	Si, Cusi, Cuxi "Rusty"	Lopa "Damp, dew, cold"	Aneyaxi "Flint Knife"	Tzi'sna' "Night"	Tap	In Odon "Stone"	Nyhee "House"
Quiyahuitl "Rain"	Dzahui, Co "Rain"	Lape "Raindrop"?	Anyeb "Rain"	T'ajkuj	Më(ë)y "Grass"	In Yehebi(n) "Rain"	Nahuiti "Star"
Xochitl "Flower"	Uaco, Coo, Coy "Macaw"	Lao "Ruler, lord"	Andoni "Flower"	Nihuana	Gügën (Note: In some sources, this sign refers to a feminine life deity.)	In Etheni "Flower"	Mañarii

=== Veintenas ===
Nahuatl	Zapotec	Otomi	Totonac	Purépecha (Note: Hurtado Mendoza believed that some months, namely Ecuata Conscuaro, Hanciuascuaro, Curindaro and Cuingo, occurred at different times than what is listed here, and that Sicuindiro was a festival held only once every four years.)	Matlatzinca	Chiapanec
Cuahuitlehua "Raising of Poles (Trees)"	Toohua	Ambuo̱ndäxi "Growth of Tender Maize Ears"	Xtayat qui'hui' "Standing Tree"	Purecatacuaro "Warriors"	?	Nongahue "That which enters"
Tlacaxipehualiztli "Flaying of Men"	Huitao	Anttzâyoh "Flaying of Dogs" (?)	La'xun "Flaying"	Cuingo "White Heron"	?	Ndoori "Xicalpextle"
Tozoztontli "Small Vigil"	Tzegag	Antzhontho "Small Flying"	Tapac taxtu	Hunisperacuaro (Note: The intercalary days (the equivalent of the nemontemi) occurred after this month.)	?	Luuri "Jocote"
Hueytozoztli "Great Vigil"	Lohuee	Antätzhoni "Great Flying"	Tlanca' lixquin	? (Note: Unlike the order of the other systems, this was the first month of the Purépecha calendar.)	In Thacari "Great Time"	Conamé "Coyol"
Toxcatl "Drought"	Yag queo	Atzibiphi "Smoke"	Palh lixquin	?	In Dehuni "To Roast Maize"	Ninyhi "Chile"
Etzalcualiztli "Eating of Fresh Maize"	Gabe na	Aneguo̱ o̱ni "Flesh of Turkey"	Pichi hua't "Half Tamal"	Mazcuto	In Thecamoni	Ñumbú Natatí "Banner-Jaguar"
Tecuilhuitontli "Small Festival of Lords"	Gola goo	Anttzu̱ngohmü "Small Feast of the Lords"	Maca taxtu	Ecuata Conscuaro "Great Gathering"	In Thirimehui "Small Change"	Ñumbi "Dog"
Huey Tecuilhuitl "Great Festival of Lords"	Cheag	Antängohmü "Great Feast of the Lords"	Maca patinit	Caheri Conscuaro	In Tamehui "Great Change"	Ñumú Putamé "Beans"
Miccailhuitontli "Small Feast of the Dead"	Gogaa	Anttzu̱ngotü "Small Feast of the Dead"	Smulaja	Hanciuascuaro "Catch Rebels"	In Iscatholohui "Small Death"	Na'ngure Natatí "Banner-Mask"
Hueymiccailhuitl "Great Feast of the Dead"	Go naa	Antängotü "Great Feast of the Dead"	Sicu'lanan	Hicuandiro "Purification"	Ima Thitohui "Great Death"	Ñundí "Coati"
Ochpaniztli "Sweeping"	Gaha	Ambaxi "Sweeping"	Sihuinit	Sicuindiro "Flaying"	Itzbacha "Broom"	Naa'ma Cutamí "Cutamí corn"
Pachtontli "Small Hay"	Tina	Anttzu̱nboxu̱gui "Small Hay"	Cuhuacna "Hay"	Charapu Zapi "Small Moss"	In Toxiqui "Small Moss"	Nanga "Small Fish"
Hueypachtli "Great Hay"	Zaha	Antäboxu̱gi "Great Hay"	Stacnan cuhuacna "Tender Hay"	Uapanscuaro "Barrios Join"	In Thaxiqui "Great Moss"	To'nbiahamo "Nothing is done"
Quecholli "Roseate Spoonbill"	Zahi	Antzhoni "Flying"	Kalhkosot "Flight"	Caheri Uapanscuaro "Great Barrios"	In Thechaqui "Night Heron"	Mahapiho "Sun"
Panquetzaliztli "Raising of Banners"	Zahuao	Anthäxhmë "White Tortilla"	Kechit	?	In Thechotahui "The Twins"	Ataporii "Mist"
Atemoztli "Descent of Water"	Yetilla	Ancändehe "Descent of Water"	Lhak puxama	Peuanscuaro	In Teyabihitzen "Fall from Above"	Matoui (after a deity)
Tititl "Stretching"	Yecho	Ambuo̱ "Growth"	Tlanca' lhtucutlit	Curindaro "Bread Offer"	In Thaxitohui "Grandfather"	Mohotoui (after a deity)
Izcalli "Rebirth"	Go hui	Anthüdo̱ni "Planting of Flowers"	Palh lhtucutlit	Tzitacuarenscuaro	?	Tomoho Tari "That is all"
Nemontemi "They fill up in vain"	Quicholla	Dupa "Dead days" (?)	Xtaca "Abandoned (days)"	?	?	Nbu/Mu

== See also ==
- Maya calendar
- Aztec calendar
- Inca calendar
- Dreamspell

== Sources ==
- ALMG (Academia de Lenguas Mayas de Guatemala) (1988). Lenguas mayas de Guatemala: documento de referencia para la pronunciación de los nuevos alfabetos oficiales. ALMG Documento 1 (in Spanish). Guatemala City: Instituto Indigenista Nacional, Ministerio de Cultura y Deportes. OCLC 20330408.
- Balkansky, Andrew (2002). "Zapotec Hieroglyphic Writing, by Javier Urcid Serrano [Book Review]". Antiquity. 76 (293): 904–905. doi:10.1017/S0003598X0009150X. ISSN 0003-598X. OCLC 1481624. S2CID 160716251.
- Bricker, Harvey M. and Victoria R. Bricker. "Correlation of Calendars." In Davíd Carrasco (ed). The Oxford Encyclopedia of Mesoamerican Cultures. Vol 1. New York : Oxford University Press, 2001. ISBN 9780195108156
- Caso, Alfonso (1971). "Calendrical Systems of Central Mexico". In Gordon F. Ekholm and Ignacio Bernal (Volume eds.) (ed.). Handbook of Middle American Indians, Vol. 10: Archaeology of Northern Mesoamerica, part I. R. Wauchope (General Editor). Austin: University of Texas Press. pp. 333–348. ISBN 978-0-292-70150-2. OCLC 277126.
- Coe, Michael D. (1987). The Maya. Ancient peoples and places series (4th edition (revised) ed.). London and New York: Thames & Hudson. ISBN 978-0-500-27455-2. OCLC 15895415.
- Edmonson, Munro S. (1988). The Book of the Year: Middle American Calendrical Systems. Salt Lake City: University of Utah Press. ISBN 978-0-87480-288-7. OCLC 17650412.
- Hassig, Ross (2001). Time, History, and Belief in Aztec and Colonial Mexico. Austin: University of Texas Press. ISBN 978-0-292-73139-4. OCLC 44167649.
- John S. Justeson and Terrence Kaufman. "Mesoamerican Calendars". In Davíd Carrasco (ed). The Oxford Encyclopedia of Mesoamerican Cultures. Vol 1. New York : Oxford University Press, 2001. ISBN 9780195188431, 9780195108156
- Kettunen, Harri; Christophe Helmke (2024). Introduction to Maya Hieroglyphs (PDF online publication). Wayeb.
- Marcus, Joyce (1992). Mesoamerican Writing Systems: Propaganda, Myth, and History in Four Ancient Civilizations. Princeton, NJ: Princeton University Press. ISBN 978-0-691-09474-8. OCLC 25549355.
- Malmström, Vincent H. (September 17, 1973). "Origin of the Mesoamerican 260-Day Calendar" (PDF Reprinted). Science. 181 (4103): 939–941. Bibcode:1973Sci...181..939M. doi:10.1126/science.181.4103.939. PMID 17835843. S2CID 41562003.
- Milbrath, Susan. "Calendar Wheels." In Davíd Carrasco (ed). The Oxford Encyclopedia of Mesoamerican Cultures Vol 1. New York : Oxford University Press, 2001. ISBN 9780195108156, 9780195188431
- Miller, Mary; Karl Taube (1993). The Gods and Symbols of Ancient Mexico and the Maya: An Illustrated Dictionary of Mesoamerican Religion. London: Thames & Hudson. ISBN 978-0-500-05068-2. OCLC 27667317.

Nowotny, Karl Anton (2005). Tlacuilolli: style and contents of the Mexican pictorial manuscripts with a catalog of the Borgia Group. George A. Everett, Jr. and Edward B. Sisson (trans. and eds.), with a foreword by Ferdinand Anders. Norman: University of Oklahoma Press. ISBN 978-0-8061-3653-0. OCLC 56527102.

- Šprajc, Ivan; Inomata, Takeshi; Aveni, Anthony F (2023). "Origin of Mesoamerican astronomy and calendar: Evidence from the Olmec and Maya regions". Science Advances. 9 (1) eabq7675. doi:10.1126/sciadv.abq7675. PMC 9821873. PMID 36608125.
