= Aztec religion =

Religion used in the Aztec Empire

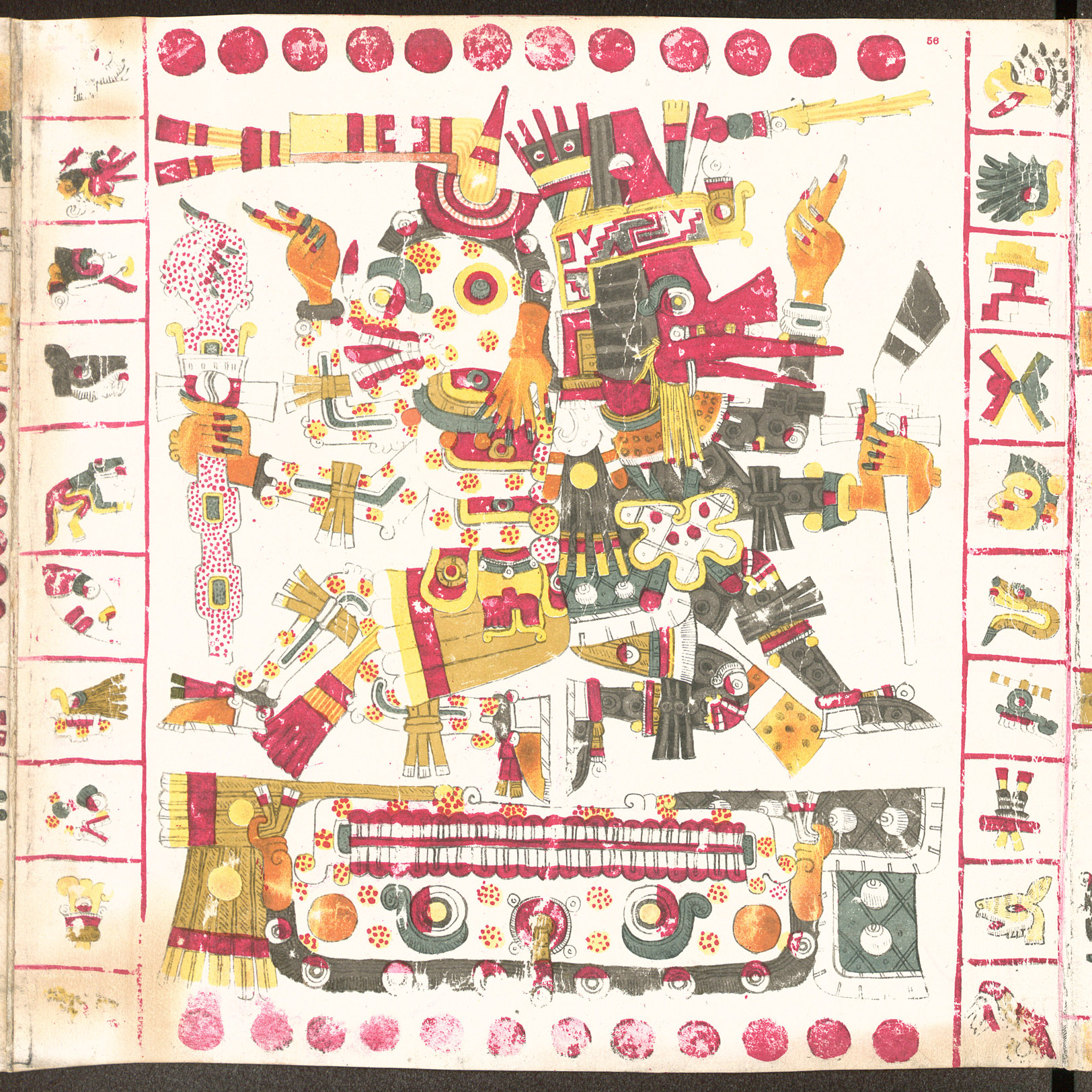
Mictlantecuhtli (left), god of death, and Quetzalcoatl, god of life; together they symbolize life and death.

The Aztec religion is a polytheistic and monistic pantheism in which the Nahua concept of teotl was construed as the supreme god Ometeotl, as well as a diverse pantheon of lesser gods and manifestations of nature. The popular religion tended to embrace the mythological and polytheistic aspects, and the Aztec Empire's state religion sponsored both the monism of the upper classes and the popular heterodoxies.

The most important deities were worshiped by priests in Tenochtitlan, particularly Tlaloc and the god of the Mexica, Huitzilopochtli, whose shrines were located on the Templo Mayor. Their priests would receive special dispensation from the empire. When other states were conquered the empire would often incorporate practices from its new territories into the mainstream religion.

In common with many other indigenous Mesoamerican civilizations, the Aztecs put great ritual emphasis on calendrics, and scheduled festivals, government ceremonies, and even war around key transition dates in the Aztec calendar. Public ritual practices could involve food, storytelling, and dance, as well as ceremonial warfare, the Mesoamerican ballgame, and human sacrifice.

The cosmology of Aztec religion divides the world into thirteen heavens and nine earthly layers or netherworlds. The first heaven overlaps with the first terrestrial layer, so that heaven and the terrestrial layers meet at the surface of the Earth. Each level is associated with a specific set of deities and astronomical objects. The most important celestial entities in Aztec religion are the Sun, the Moon, and the planet Venus (as both "morning star" and "evening star").

After the Spanish Conquest, Aztec people were obliged to convert to Catholicism, and the two religions syncretized. This syncretism is evidenced by the Virgin of Guadalupe and the Day of the Dead.

== Teotl ==
Nahua metaphysics centers around teotl, "a single, dynamic, vivifying, eternally self-generating and self-regenerating sacred power, energy or force." This is conceptualized in a kind of monistic pantheism as manifest in the supreme god Ometeotl, as well as a large pantheon of lesser gods and idealizations of natural phenomena such as stars and fire. Priests and educated upper classes held more monistic views, while the popular religion of the uneducated tended to embrace the polytheistic and mythological aspects.

Teotl is sometimes translated as "god", but it held more abstract aspects of divinity or supernatural energy, akin to the Polynesian concept of Mana.

In first contact with the Spanish prior to the conquest, emperor Moctezuma II and the Aztecs generally referred to Cortés and the conquistadors as "teotl". Some historians interpret this to mean that the Aztecs believed them to be gods, but a better understanding of teotl suggests that they were being referred to as "mysterious" or "inexplicable".

== Pantheon ==
The Aztecs would often adopt gods from different cultures and allow them to be worshiped as part of their pantheon. For example, the fertility god, Xipe Totec, was originally a god of the Yopi (the Nahuatl name of the Tlapanec people), but became an integrated part of the Aztec belief system. Further, sometimes foreign gods would be identified with an already existing god. Other deities, such as Tezcatlipoca and Quetzalcoatl, had roots in earlier civilizations of Mesoamerica, and were worshiped by many cultures under different names.

The many gods of the Aztecs can be grouped into complexes related to different themes. Some were associated with aspects of nature, such as Tlaloc and Quetzalcoatl, and other gods were associated with specific trades. Reflecting the complexity of ritual in Aztec society, there were deities related to pulque, a sacred alcoholic beverage, but also deities of drunkenness, excess, fun, and games. Many gods had multiple aspects with different names, where each name highlighted a specific function or trait of the god. Occasionally, two distinct gods were conflated into one, and quite often, deities transformed into one another within a single story. Aztec images sometimes combined attributes of several divinities.

Aztec scholar H. B. Nicholson (1971) classed the gods into three groups according to their conceptual meaning in general Mesoamerican religion. The first group he called the "celestial creativity—divine paternalism group". The second: the Earth-mother gods, the pulque gods, and Xipe Totec. The third group, the War-Sacrifice-Sanguinary Nourishment group, contained such gods as Ometochtli, Huitzilopochtli, Mictlantecuhtli and Mixcoatl. A more specific classification based upon the functional attributes of the deities is as follows:

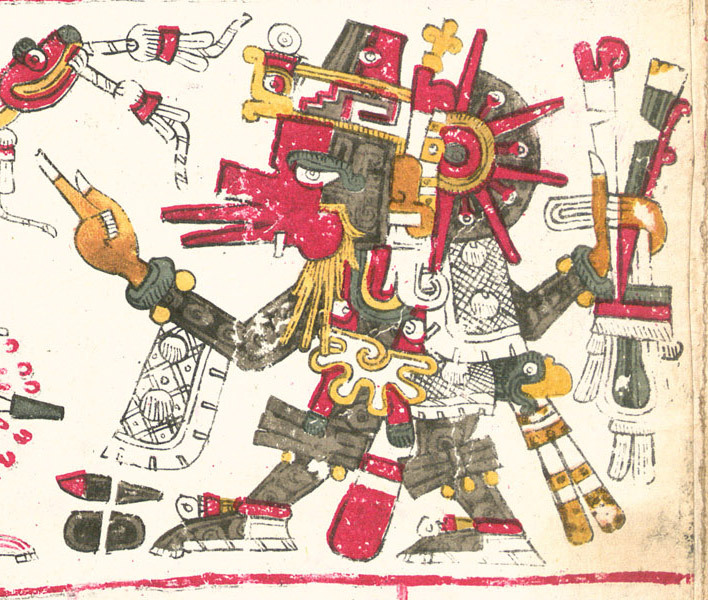
Quetzalcoatl, god of the winds and knowledge, in the Codex Borgia

Cultural god

- Tezcatlipoca: meaning “Lord of the Smoking Mirror", trickster deity, shaman, and the patron god of the ruling class. Associated with the form of the jaguar
- Quetzalcoatl: god of knowledge, monsters, life, and wind, and is the patron god of priests and the Aztec elite. He participated in the creation of human life. The Aztecs believed the planet Venus to be Quetzalcoatl's ascended heart.
- Mixcoatl: meaning "cloud serpent", god of the heavens and the hunt
- Huitzilopochtli: god of sun, war, and the patron god of the Mexica of Tenochtitlan
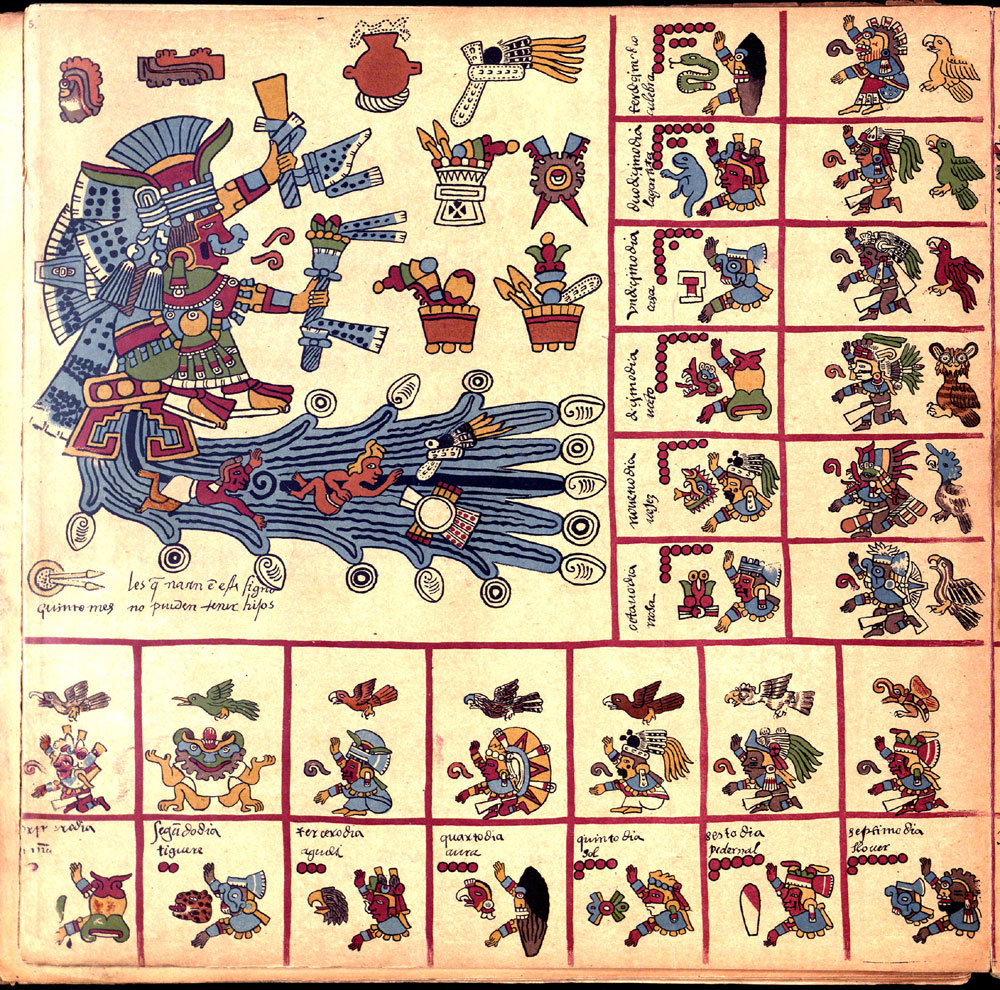
Chalchiuhtlicue, goddess of water and mistress of lakes, in the Codex Borbonicus

Nature gods

- Tlaloc: a Pan-Mesoamerican god of lightning, rain, water, and thunder
- Tlaltecuhtli: meaning "earth lord", goddess of the Earth
- Chalchiuhtlicue: meaning "jade her skirt", goddess of springs, running water, lakes, rivers, seas, streams, horizontal waters, storms, and baptism
- Centzon Huitznahua: meaning "the 400 southerners", gods of the stars
- Ehecatl: the wind, often conflated with Quetzalcoatl and called "Quetzalcoatl-Ehecatl"
- Tepeyollotl: god of the animals, darkened caves, echoes, and earthquakes. Tepeyollotl is a variant of Tezcatlipoca and is associated with mountains.

Gods of creation

- Ōmeteōtl/Tōnacātēcuhtli: the Lord of Sustenance and one of the creators of all things
- Huehuetéotl/Xiuhtecuhtli: meaning "old god" and "turquoise lord", god of origin, time, fire and old age
- Coatlicue/Toci/Teteoinnan/Tonantzin: progenitor goddesses

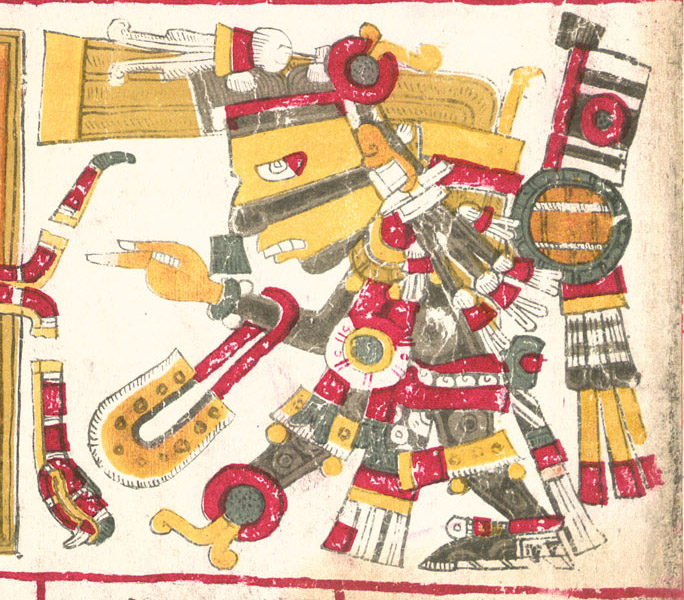
Tezcatlipoca, god of providence, in the Codex Borgia.

Lords of the Night

- Metztli: goddess (or god) of the moon
- Xiuhtecuhtli: god of fire and time
- Tezcatlipoca: god of providence, the darkness and the invisible, lord of the night, ruler of the North.
- Citlalicue: goddess of female stars in the Milky Way.
- Citlalatonac: god of female stars (Husband of Citlalicue)
- Piltzintecuhtli: god of visions, associated with Mercury (the planet that is visible just before sunrise or just after sunset) and healing
- Xolotl: lord of the evening star and the planet mercury, twin of Quetzalcoatl

Lords of the Day

- Xiuhtecuhtli: god of fire and time
- Tonatiuh: god of the Sun
- Tlahuizcalpantecuhtli: god of dawn (Venus)

Gods of pulque and excess

- Tlazolteotl: goddess of filth and childbirth
- Tepoztecatl: god of pulque worshipped at Tepoztlan
- Xochiquetzal: goddess of pleasure, indulgence, and sex
- Tlazolteotl: goddess of lust, carnality, and sexual misdeeds.
- Mayahuel: goddess of pulque and maguey
- The Ahuiateteo:
  - Macuiltochtli
  - Macuilxochitl
  - Macuil Cuetzpalin
  - Macuilcozcacuauhtli
  - Macuil Malinalli
- Centzon Totochtin: meaning "the 400 rabbits", god of intoxication
  - Ometochtli: meaning "two rabbit", leader of the Centzon Totochtin, god of fertility and intoxication

Gods of maize and fertility

- Xipe Totec: meaning "our flayed lord", fertility god associated with spring, patron god of goldsmiths
- Centeotl: god of maize
- Chicomecoatl: goddess of agriculture
- Xilonen: goddess of tender maize
- Xochipilli: meaning "flower prince", god of happiness, flowers, pleasure, and fertility

Gods of death and the underworld

- Mictlantecuhtli: lord of the underworld
- Mictlancihuatl: queen of the underworld

Trade gods

- Yacatecuhtli: meaning "nose lord", god of merchants
- Patecatl: god of doctors and medicine

== Religion and society ==
Religion was part of all levels of Aztec society. On the state level, religion was controlled by the Tlatoani and the high priests governing the main temples in the ceremonial precinct of the Aztec capital of Tenochtitlan. This level involved the large monthly festivals and a number of specific rituals centered around the ruler dynasty and attempted to stabilize both the political and cosmic systems. These rituals were the ones that involved a sacrifice of humans. One of these rituals was the feast of Huey Tozoztli, when the ruler himself ascended Mount Tlaloc and engaged in autosacrifice in order to petition the rains. Throughout society, each level had their own rituals and deities and played their part in the larger rituals of the community. For example, the class of Pochteca merchants were involved in the feast Tlaxochimaco, where the merchant deity would be celebrated and slaves bought on specific slave markets by long-distance traders would be sacrificed. On the feast of Ochpaniztli all commoners participated in sweeping the streets. Afterwards, they also undertook ritual bathing. The most spectacular ritual was the New Fire ceremony which took place every 52 years and involved every citizen of the Aztec realm. During this, commoners would destroy house utensils, quench all fires, and receive new fire from the bonfire on top of Mt. Huixachtlan, lit on the chest of a sacrificed person by the high priests. Women were also a vital part of Aztec society and religion. Many women had the right to land and the ability to vote on important issues. The Aztec deities also reflected this, as many of the essential deities were women.

== Priests and temples ==
In the Nahuatl language, the word for priest was teopixqui – meaning "god guard". These men were seen as prominent leaders of the community who taught various ideas and morals to the public. Tlamacazqui the "giver of things" ensured that the gods were given their due in the form of offerings, ceremonies, and sacrifices.

The Tlatoani of Tenochtitlan was the head of the cult of Huitzilopochtli and of the state religion of the Aztec empire. He had special priestly duties in different rituals on the state level.

However, the Aztec religious organization was not entirely under his authority. Bernardino de Sahagún and Duran describe the pairs of high priests (quetzalcoatlus) who were in charge of the major pilgrimage centres (Cholula and Tenochtitlan) as enjoying immense respect from all levels of Aztec society—akin to archbishops—and a level of authority that partly transcended national boundaries. Under these religious heads were many tiers of priests, priestesses, novices, nuns, and monks (some part-time) who ran the cults of the various gods and goddesses. Sahagún reports that the priests had very strict training, and had to live very austere and ethical lives involving prolonged vigils, fasts, and penances. For instance, they often had to bleed themselves and undertake prescribed self-mortifications in the buildup to sacrificial rites.

Additionally, Sahagún refers to classes of religious specialists not affiliated with the established priesthood. This included wandering curers, black magicians, and other occultists (of which the Aztecs identified many types, most of which they feared) and hermits. Finally, the military orders, professions (e.g. traders (pochteca)) and wards (calpulli) each operated their own lodge dedicated to their specific god. The heads of these lodges, although not full-time religious specialists, had some ritual and moral duties. Duran also describes lodge members as having the responsibility of raising sufficient goods to host the festivals of their specific patron deity. This included annually obtaining and training a suitable slave or captive to represent and die as the image of their deity in that festival.

Aztec temples were basically offering mounds: solid pyramidal structures crammed with special soils, sacrifices, treasures and other offerings. Buildings around the base of the pyramid, and sometimes a small chamber under the pyramid, stored ritual items and provided lodgings and staging for priests, dancers, and temple orchestras. The pyramids were buried under a new surface every several years (especially every 52 years—the Aztec century). Thus the pyramid-temples of important deities constantly grew in size.

In front of every major temple lay a large plaza. This sometimes held important ritual platforms such as the "eagle stone" where some victims were slain. Plazas were where the bulk of worshippers gathered to watch rites and dances performed, to join in the songs and sacrifices (the audience often bled themselves during the rites), and to partake in any festival foods. Nobility sat on tiered seating under awnings around the plaza periphery, and some conducted part of the ceremonies on the temple.

Continual rebuilding enabled Tlatoani and other dignitaries to celebrate their achievements by dedicating new sculptures, monuments, and other renovations to the temples. For festivals, temple steps and tiers were also festooned with flowers, banners and other decorations. Each pyramid had a flat top to accommodate dancers and priests performing rites. Close to the temple steps there was usually a sacrificial slab and braziers.

The temple house (calli) itself was relatively small, although the more important ones had high and ornately carved internal ceilings. To maintain the sanctity of the gods, these temple houses were kept fairly dark and mysterious—a characteristic that was further enhanced by having their interiors swirling with smoke from copal (meaning incense) and the burning of offerings. Cortes and Diaz describe these sanctuaries as containing sacred images and relics of the gods, often bejeweled but shrouded under ritual clothes and other veils and hidden behind curtains hung with feathers and bells. Flowers and offerings (including a great amount of blood) generally covered much of the floors and walls near these images. Each image stood on a pedestal and occupied its own sanctuary. Larger temples also featured subsidiary chambers accommodating lesser deities.

In the ceremonial center of Tenochtitlan, the most important temple was the Great Temple which was a double pyramid with two temples on top. One was dedicated to Huitzilopochtli; this temple was called Coatepec (meaning "snake mountain"), and the other temple was dedicated to Tlaloc. Below the Tlatoani were the high priests of these two temples. Both high priests were called by the title Quetzalcoatl—the high priest of Huitzilopochtli was Quetzalcoatl Totec Tlamacazqui and the high priest of Tlaloc was Quetzalcoatl Tlaloc Tlamacazqui. Other important temples were located in the four divisions of the town. One example was the temple called Yopico in Moyotlan which was dedicated to Xipe Totec. Furthermore, all the calpullis had special temples dedicated to the patron gods of the calpulli. Priests were educated at the Calmecac if they were from noble families and in the Telpochcalli if they were commoners.

== Cosmology and ritual ==
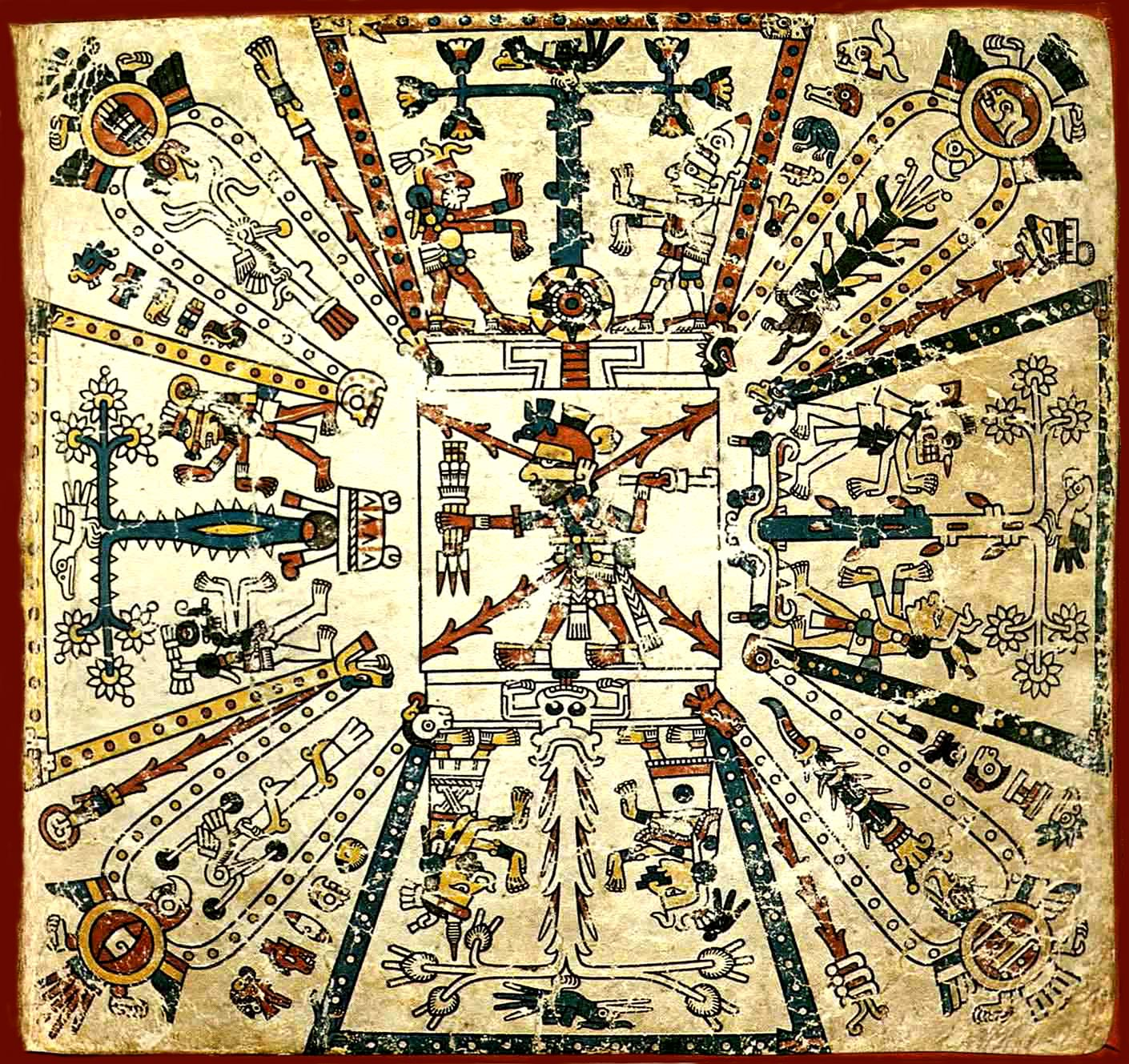
From the Codex Fejérváry-Mayer, an Aztec cosmological drawing with the god Xiuhtecuhtli, the lord of fire, and the calendar in the center with the other important gods around him each in front of a sacred tree

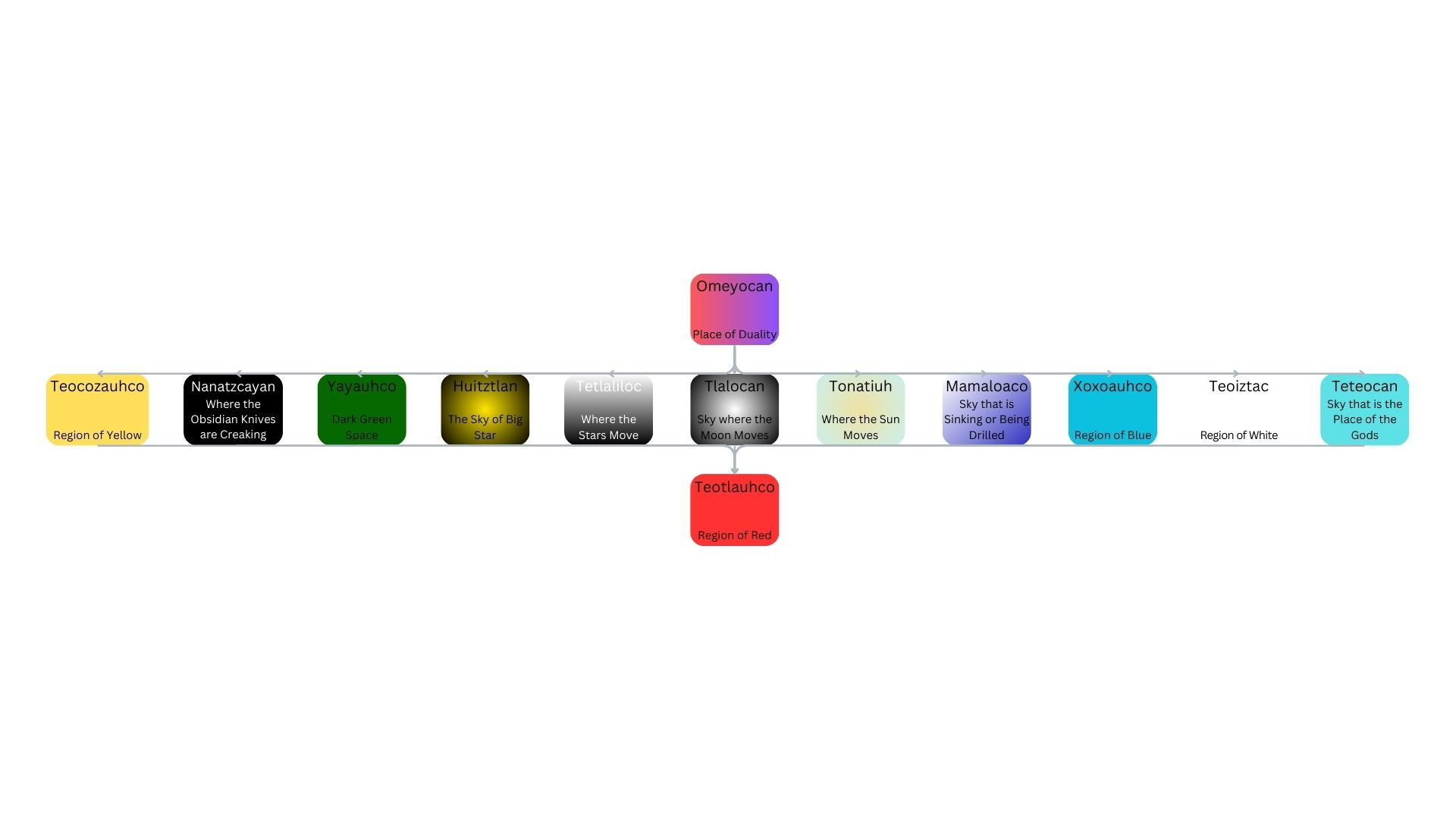
Diagram of Thirteen Heavens based on Burr Brundage's book and Adela Fernández's list of world names and descriptions.

The Aztec world consisted of three main parts: the earth world on which humans lived (including Tamoanchan, the mythical origin of human beings), an underworld which belonged to the dead (called Mictlan, "place of death"), and the upper plane in the sky. The earth and the underworld were both open for humans to enter, whereas the upper plane in the sky was impenetrable to humans. Existence was envisioned as straddling the two worlds in a cycle of birth, life, death and rebirth. Thus as the sun was believed to dwell in the underworld at night to rise reborn in the morning and maize kernels were interred to later sprout anew, the human and divine existence was also envisioned as being cyclical. The upper and nether worlds were both thought to be layered. Mictlan had nine layers which were inhabited by different deities and mythical beings. The sky had thirteen layers, the highest of which was called Omeyocan ("place of duality") and served as the residence of the progenitor dual god Ometeotl. The lowest layer is said to have housed the fire god and was level with the Earth.

After death, the soul of the Aztec went to one of three places: the sun, Mictlan, or Tlalocan. Souls of fallen warriors and women that died in childbirth would transform into hummingbirds that followed the sun on its journey through the sky. Souls of people who died from less glorious causes would go to Mictlan. Those who drowned would go to Tlalocan.

In Aztec cosmology, as in Mesoamerica in general, geographical features such as caves and mountains held symbolic value as places of crossing between the upper and nether worlds. The cardinal directions were symbolically connected to the religious layout of the world as well; each direction was associated with specific colors and gods.

To the Aztecs, death was instrumental in the perpetuation of creation, and gods and humans alike had the responsibility of sacrificing themselves in order to allow life to continue. This worldview is best described in the myth of the five suns recorded in the Codex Chimalpopoca, which recounts how Quetzalcoatl stole the bones of the previous generation in the underworld and how later the gods created four successive worlds or "suns" for their subjects to live in, all of which were destroyed. Then, by an act of self-sacrifice, one of the gods, Nanahuatzin ("the pimpled one"), caused a fifth and final sun to rise where the first humans, made out of maize dough, could live thanks to his sacrifice. Humans were responsible for the sun's continued revival. Blood sacrifices in various forms were conducted. Both humans and animals were sacrificed, depending on the god to be placated and the ceremony being conducted, and priests of some gods were sometimes required to provide their own blood through self-mutilation.

Sacrificial rituals among the Aztecs, and in Mesoamerica in general, must be seen in the context of religious cosmology: sacrifice and death was necessary for the continued existence of the world. Likewise, each part of life had one or more deities associated with it and these had to be paid their dues in order to achieve success. Gods were paid with sacrificial offerings of food, flowers, effigies, and quail. But the larger the effort required of the god, the greater the sacrifice had to be. Blood fed the gods and kept the sun from falling. For some of the most important rites, a priest would offer his own blood by cutting his ears, arms, tongue, thighs, chest, genitals, or offer a human life or a god's life. The people who were sacrificed came from many segments of society and might have been a war captive, slave, or a member of Aztec society; the sacrifice might also have been man or woman, adult or child, or noble or commoner.

=== Myth embodiment ===
An important aspect of Aztec ritual life was the teixiptla, which can be understood as a kind of "substitute" or embodiment of a godly being. Priests or otherwise specially elected individuals would be dressed up to achieve the likeness of a specific deity. To honor the gods, various outfits and festivals were held. The Aztec deities served as providers for all of the society's needs. Along with various rituals and offerings, dressing up was thought as a way to respect the gods worshiped. It was considered an honor to impersonate a god. The person selected to do so was venerated as an actual physical manifestation of the god. This would sometimes end in the impersonator's death, such as in the many ritual sacrifices tied to certain deities (see below). Other times the impersonator would survive, such as in a ceremony where a priest impersonated the water goddess Chalchiuhtlicue to welcome the water brought to Tenochtitlan by an aqueduct.

As with the impersonation of gods, Aztec ritual was often a reenactment of a mythical event which at once served to remind the Aztecs of their religion, bring about good luck in daily life, and forward a political goal. These reenactments often took a form similar to European theater, but the Aztec understanding of such performances were very different; there was no clear divide between the "actor" and the figure they played.

=== Pantheism ===
See also, Aztec philosophy

There has been discussion on whether the Aztec religion was a polytheistic or pantheistic religion. Pantheism is the belief that everything is divine and the divine is everything. James Maffie, in his book Aztec Philosophy: Understanding a World in Motion, argued that the religion of the Aztecs was pantheistic in nature. Maffie believes that the Aztec view of teotl, found in their poetry, is sufficient to constitute a monist pantheism. He provides nine characteristics of teotl as supporting this view, focusing on his interpretation of the cosmos being a unity that is ontologically identical with teotl.

Several other authors discuss pantheism in Aztec religion and philosophy. Miguel León-Portilla examines pantheism though he hesitates to label it as entirely pantheistic, instead positing that a specific interpretation of their theology and philosophy is more representative of Aztec thought. Louise M. Burkhart also claims that the theology of the Aztecs was monist in nature, though polytheistic. Like Maffie, she posits that monism arises from teotl, which she sees as the primary agent regarding the nature of the universe.

However, this view of Aztec religion was relegated to the priests and upper classes. The religion of the common people was polytheistic, worshiping the many deities as separate entities.

=== Dualism ===
See also, Aztec philosophy

Like other Mesoamerican religions, the Aztec religion contained aspects of dualism within their conception of the world. An example of this is the deity Ometeotl, who is split into Ometecuhtli (Lord of Duality) and Omecihuatl (Dual Lady). They dwell in the place of duality together, which is one of the thirteen heavens. However, despite being referred to as separate entities, they are complementary parts of a whole. Miguel León-Portilla describes the linguistic evidence for this, found in a passage of the Códice Matritense de la Real Academia and presented in his book Aztec Thought and Culture. In a section on the various heavens, the line “There dwells the true god and his consort” is dissected. Examining the word i-námic, commonly translated as “consort”, León-Portilla derives it from the prefix of i (the possessive prefix) and the verb namique (“to find, to help”). The prefix is not only a possessive but can be translated as “of him” or “equal to him”. Therefore, his consort is simply another aspect of him, which constitutes a form of dialectical monism and not true dualism.

León-Portilla also examines the phrase “flower and song”, which is an idiom referring to the poetry and creative works of the Aztecs. It is a difrasismo, two words put together that form a singular metaphorical unit. These grammatical constructions also illustrate the dualism of both the Aztec language and religion and they are also common in prayers.

Another example of dualist thought in Aztec religion is in the design of the great Templo Mayor in Tenochtitlan. Atop the great pyramid sat two shrines, one to Tlaloc, the god of rain and agriculture, and the other to Huitzipochtli, the god of warfare and the god of the Mexica. These two opposing shrines at the top of the Templo Mayor also represented the society of Tenochtitlan, both the aspects of their society that demanded tribute and warfare but also the domestic aspects such as agriculture.

== Calendar ==
The Aztec religious year was connected mostly to the natural 365-day calendar, the xiuhpohualli ("yearcount"), which followed the agricultural year. Each of the 18 twenty-day months of the religious year had its particular religious festival—most of which were connected to agricultural themes. The greatest festival was the xiuhmolpilli, or New Fire ceremony, held every 52 years when the ritual and agricultural calendars coincided and a new cycle started. In the table below, the veintena festivals are shown, the deities with which they were associated and the kinds of rituals involved. The descriptions of the rites are based on the descriptions given in Sahagún's Primeros Memoriales, the Florentine Codex, and of Diego Durán's Of the Gods and Rites—all of which provide detailed accounts of the rituals written in Nahuatl soon after the conquest.

When the Spaniards documented Aztec religious and ritual life, they provided abundant evidence that suggests that there existed a correspondence between the tropical year, the cycles of nature, and Aztec ceremonies. Given that such a relation existed, and that ritual functioned to reinforce it, scholars speculate that an unknown method must have been used to maintain the calendar in harmony with the solar year.

Festival	Period	Principal deity	Theme	Rituals
Atlcahualo also called "Xilomanaliztli", "Spreading of corn"	14 February–5 March	The Tlalocs	Fertility, sowing	Cuahuitl Ehua: a ceremonial raising of a tree, the sacrifice of children to Tlaloc
Tlacaxipehualiztli "Flaying of men"	6 March–25 March	Xipe Totec	Spring, sprouting, fertility	Sacrifice and Flaying of Captives, mock battles, gladiatorial sacrifice, priests wear victims skin for 20 days, military ceremonies
Tozoztontli "Little vigil"	26 March–14 April	Tlaltecuhtli (as well as the Tlalocs and Xipe Totec)	Planting, sowing	Bloodletting, burial of the skins of the flayed captives, offering of flowers and roasted snakes to the earth.
Huey Tozoztli "Great vigil"	15 April–4 May	Cinteotl (as well as the Tlalocs and Chicomecoatl)	Maize, seed, sowing	Feasts to Tlaloc and the maize gods, blessing of seed corn, sacrifice of children at Mt. Tlaloc.
Toxcatl "Drought"	5 May–22 May	Tezcatlipoca and Huitzilopochtli	Renewal	Feasting, dancing, the sacrifice of small birds, the sacrifice of Tezcatlipoca
Etzalcualiztli "Eating of fresh maize"	23 May–13 June	Tlaloc, Chalchiuhtlicue, Quetzalcoatl	Young crops, end of dry season	Sacrifice of Tlaloc, new mats made
Tecuilhuitontli "Small festival of lords"	14 June–3 July	Xochipilli		Feasts to goddesses of grain, sacrifice of Huixtocihuatl
Huey Tecuilhuitl "Great festival of lords"	4 July–23 July	Xilonen, maize gods	The Lords, tender maize	Feast of Xilonen, the sacrifice of Cihuacoatl and Xilonen, lords feed the commoners, dancing
Tlaxochimaco "Giving of flowers" (also called Miccailhuitontli—"Small feast of the dead")	24 July–12 August	Huitzilopochtli	Flowers, trade	A small feast for the dead, feast of the merchants, the making of the Xocotl pole
Xocotl Huetzi "Fruits fall" (also called Huey Miccailhuitontli—"Great feast of the dead")	13 August–1 September	Huehueteotl, Xiuhtecuhtli	Fruits, harvest	The feasts of the Xocotl pole, bloodletting
Ochpaniztli "Sweeping"	2 September–21 September	Tlazolteotl, Toci, Teteo Innan, Coatlicue, Cinteotl	Harvest, cleansing	Ritual sweeping, ritual bathing, the sacrifice of Teteo Innan
Teteo Eco "The gods arrive"	22 September–11 October	All deities	Arrival of the gods	Bloodletting, the feast of Huitzilopochtli, the dance of the old men
Tepeilhuitl "Mountain feast"	12 October–31 October	Xochiquetzal, The Tlalocs, Trade Gods	Mountains	Mountain feasts, sacrifice of Xochiquetzal, feasts of the gods of different trades
Quecholli "Roseate Spoonbill"	1 November–20 November	Mixcoatl	Hunting	Ritual hunts, the sacrifice of slaves and captives, weapon making, armories replenished
Panquetzaliztli "Raising of banners"	21 November – 10 December	Huitzilopochtli	Tribal festival of the Aztecs, birth of Huitzilopochtli	Raising of banners, Great Huitzilopochtli Festival, sacrifices of slaves and captives, ritual battles, drinking of pulque, bloodletting
Atemoztli "Descent of water"	11 December–30 December	The Tlalocs	Rain	Waterfeasts, the sacrifice of Tlaloc effigies made from maize dough
Tititl "Stretching"	31 December–19 January	Ilamatecuhtli (Cihuacoatl)	Old age	Feasts to old people, the dance of the Cihuateteo, fertility rituals, merchants sacrifice slaves
Izcalli "Rebirth"	20 January–8 February	Tlaloc, Xiuhtecuhtli	Fertility, water, sowing	Eating of Amaranth Tamales, feast for Xiuhtecuhtli every four years
Nemontemi	9 February–13 February	Tzitzimime demons		Five unlucky days at the end of the year, abstinence, no business

== Mythology ==
The main deity in the Mexica religion was the sun god and war god, Huitzilopochtli. He directed the Mexicas to found a city on the site where they would see an eagle, devouring an animal (not all chronicles agree on what the eagle was devouring, one says it was a precious bird, and though Father Duran says it was a snake, this is not mentioned in any pre-Hispanic source), while perching on a fruit bearing nopal cactus. According to legend, Huitzilopochtli had to kill his nephew, Cópil, and throw his heart on the lake. But, since Cópil was his relative, Huitzilopochtli decided to honor him, and caused a cactus to grow over Cópil's heart which became a sacred place.

Legend has it that this is the site on which the Mexicas built their capital city of Tenochtitlan. Tenochtitlan was built on an island in the middle of Lake Texcoco, where modern-day Mexico City is located. This legendary vision is pictured on the Coat of Arms of Mexico.

According to their own history, when the Mexicas arrived in the Anahuac Valley around Lake Texcoco, they were considered by the other groups as the least civilized of all. The Mexicas decided to learn, and they took all they could from other peoples, especially from the ancient Toltec (whom they seem to have partially confused with the more ancient civilization of Teotihuacan). To the Mexicas, the Toltecs were the originators of all culture; toltecayotl was a synonym for culture. Mexica legends identify the Toltecs and the cult of Quetzalcoatl with the mythical city of Tollan, which they also identified with the more ancient Teotihuacan.

In the process, they adopted most of the Toltec/Nahua pantheon, but they also made significant changes in their religion. As the Mexica rose in power, they adopted the Nahua gods at equal status to their own. For instance, Tlaloc was the rain god of all the Nahuatl-speaking peoples. They put their local god Huitzilopochtli at the same level as the ancient Nahua god, and also replaced the Nahua sun god with their own. Thus, Tlaloc/Huitzilopochtli represents the duality of water and fire, as evidenced by the twin pyramids uncovered near the Zocalo in Mexico City in the late 1970s, and it is reminiscent of the warrior ideals of the Aztec: the Aztec glyph of war is burning water.

== Human sacrifice ==
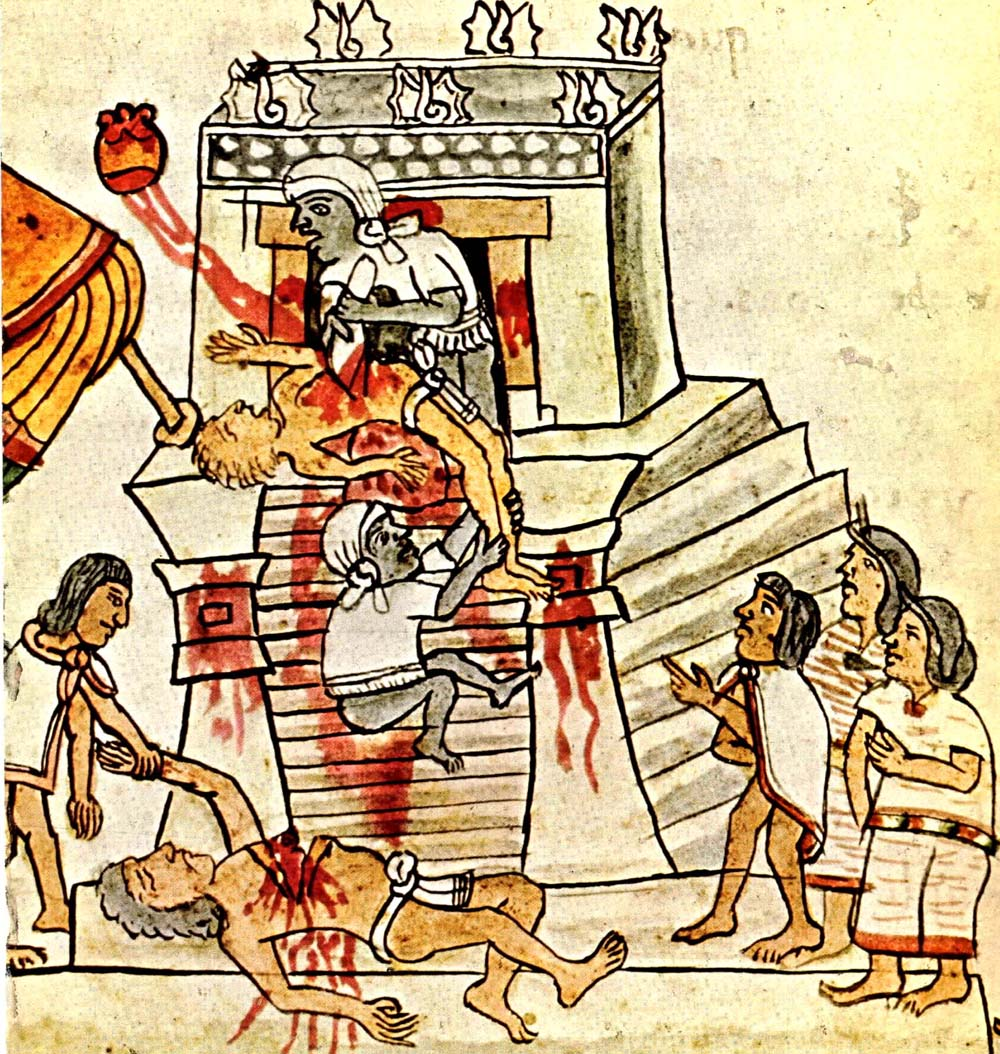
Human sacrifice as shown in the Codex Magliabechiano, Folio 70. Heart-extraction was viewed as a means of liberating the istli and reuniting it with the Sun: the victim's transformed heart flies sun-ward on a trail of blood.

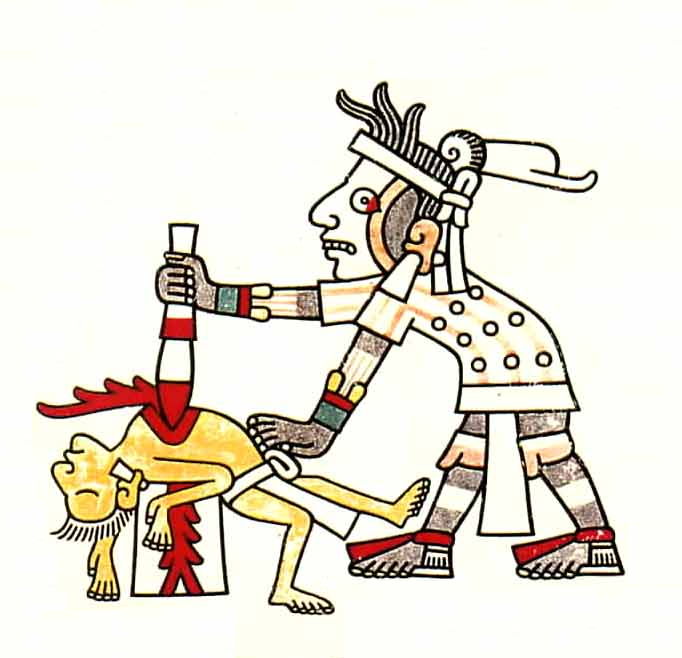
Human sacrifice depicted in the Codex Laud

Human sacrifice was practiced on a grand scale throughout the Aztec empire, which was performed in honor of the gods, although the exact figures are unknown. At Tenochtitlán, the principal Aztec city, "between 10,000 and 80,400 people" were sacrificed over the course of four days for the dedication of the Great Pyramid in 1487, according to Ross Hassig . Excavations of the offerings in the main temple has provided some insight in the process, but the dozens of remains excavated are far short of the thousands of sacrifices recorded by eyewitnesses and other historical accounts. For millennia, the practice of human sacrifice was widespread in Mesoamerican and South American cultures. It was a theme in the Olmec religion, which thrived between 1200 BCE and 400 BCE and among the Maya. Human sacrifice was a very complex ritual. Every sacrifice had to be meticulously planned from the type of victim to the specific ceremony needed for the god. The sacrificial victims were usually captured warriors but sometimes slaves, depending upon the god and needed ritual. The higher the rank of the warrior the better he was looked at as a sacrifice. In some cases, the victim(s) would then take on the persona of the god he was to be sacrificed for and be housed, fed, and dressed accordingly. This process could last up to a year, such as in the case of Tezcatlipoca's ceremony. When the sacrificial day arrived, the victim(s) would participate in the specific ceremonies of the god. Ceremonies to different gods would take different forms to appease specific gods; children would be drowned and made to cry for Tlaloc while victims were burned for the fire god. Then five priests, known as the Tlenamacac, performed the sacrifice usually at the top of a pyramid. In most cases, the victim would be laid upon the table, held down and subsequently have his heart cut out.

=== Sacrifices to specific gods ===
==== Huitzilopochtli ====
When the Aztecs sacrificed people to Huitzilopochtli (the god with warlike aspects) the victim would be placed on a sacrificial stone. The priest would then cut through the abdomen with an obsidian or flint blade. The heart would be torn out still beating and held towards the sky in honor to the sun-god. The body would then be pushed down the pyramid where the Coyolxauhqui stone could be found. The Coyolxauhqui Stone recreates the story of Coyolxauhqui, Huitzilopochtli's sister who was dismembered at the base of a mountain, just as the sacrificial victims were. The body would be carried away and either cremated or given to the warrior responsible for the capture of the victim. He would either cut the body in pieces and send them to important people as an offering, or use the pieces for ritual cannibalism. The warrior would thus ascend one step in the hierarchy of the Aztec social classes, a system that rewarded successful warriors.

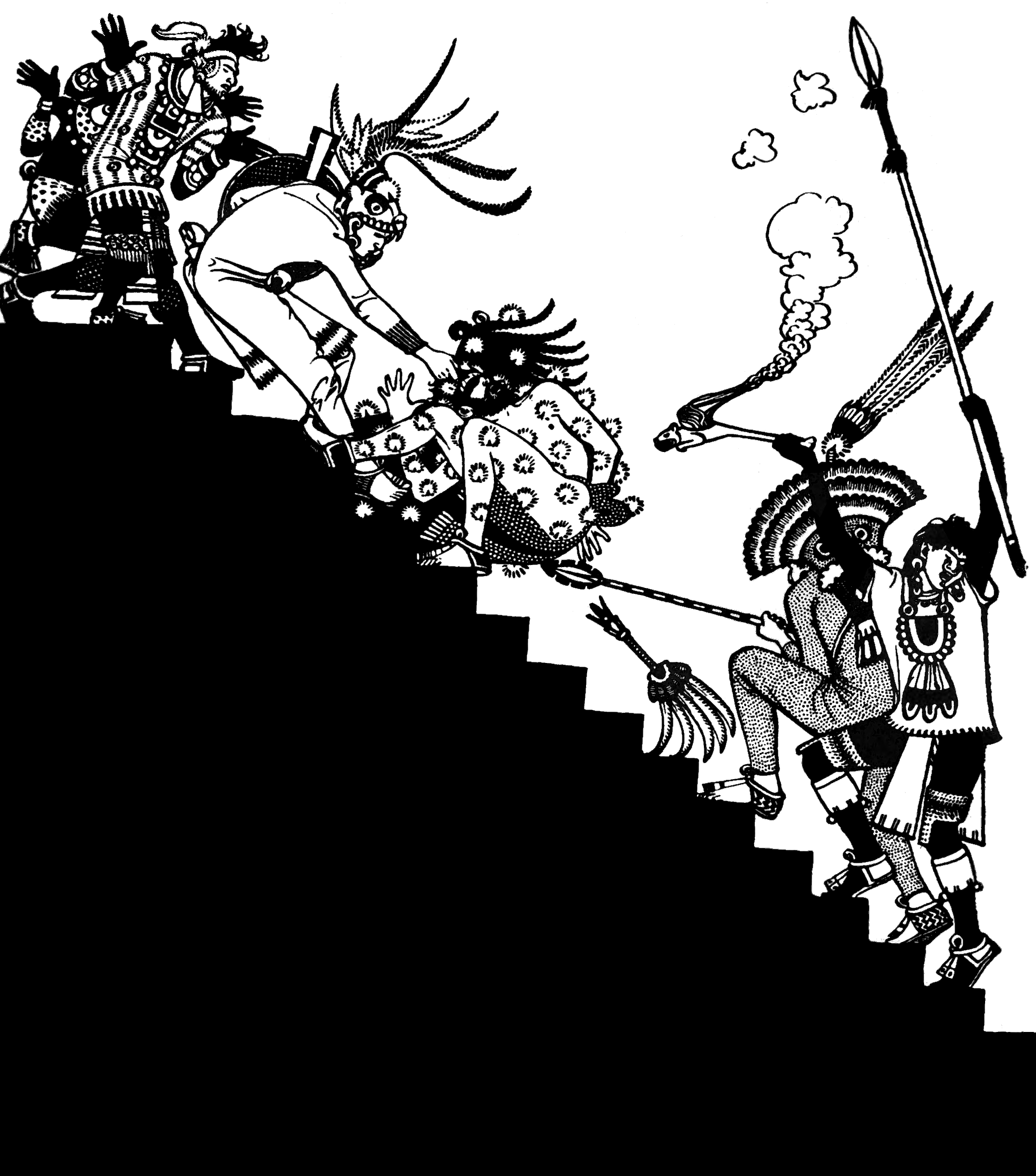
Prisoners for sacrifice were decorated.

During the festival of Panquetzaliztli, of which Huitzilopochtli was the patron, sacrificial victims would be adorned in the manner of Huitzilopochtli's costume and blue body paint before their hearts were removed. Representations of Huitzilopochtli called teixiptla were also worshipped, the most significant being the one at the Templo Mayor which was made of dough mixed with sacrificial blood.

==== Tezcatlipoca ====
Some captives were sacrificed to Tezcatlipoca in ritual gladiatorial combat. The victim was tethered in place and given a mock weapon. He died fighting against up to four fully armed jaguar knights and eagle warriors.

During the 20-day month of Toxcatl, a young impersonator of Tezcatlipoca would be sacrificed. Throughout a year, this youth would be dressed as Tezcatlipoca and treated as a living incarnation of the god. The youth would represent Tezcatlipoca on earth; he would get four beautiful women as his companions until he was killed. In the meantime he walked through the streets of Tenochtitlan playing a flute. On the day of the sacrifice, a feast would be held in Tezcatlipoca's honor. The young man would climb the pyramid, break his flute and surrender his body to the priests. Sahagún compared it to the Christian Easter.

==== Huehueteotl/Xiuhtecuhtli ====
Both Xiuhtecuhtli and Huehueteotl were worshipped during the festival of Izcalli. For ten days preceding the festival various animals would be captured by the Aztecs, to be thrown in the hearth on the night of celebration.

To appease Huehueteotl, the fire god and a senior deity, the Aztecs had a ceremony where they prepared a large feast, at the end of which they would burn captives; before they died they would be taken from the fire and their hearts would be cut out. Motolinía and Sahagún reported that the Aztecs believed that if they did not placate Huehueteotl, a plague of fire would strike their city. The sacrifice was considered an offering to the deity.

Xiuhtecuhtli was also worshipped during the New Fire Ceremony, which occurred every 52 years, and prevented the end of the world. During the festival priests would march to the top of the volcano Huixachtlan and when the constellation "the fire drill" (Orion's belt) rose over the mountain, a man would be sacrificed. The victim's heart would be ripped from his body and a ceremonial hearth would be lit in the hole in his chest. This flame would then be used to light all of the ceremonial fires in various temples throughout the city of Tenochtitlan.

==== Tlaloc ====
Archaeologists have found the remains of at least 42 children sacrificed to Tlaloc at the Great Pyramid of Tenochtitlan. Many of the children suffered from serious injuries before their death, they would have to have been in significant pain as Tlaloc required the tears of the young as part of the sacrifice. The priests made the children cry during their way to immolation: a good omen that Tlaloc would wet the earth in the raining season.

==== Xipe Totec ====
Xipe Totec was worshipped extensively during the festival of Tlacaxipehualiztli, in which captured warriors and slaves were sacrificed in the ceremonial center of the city of Tenochtitlan. For forty days prior to their sacrifice one victim would be chosen from each ward of the city to act as teixiptla, dress and live as Xipe Totec. The victims were then taken to the Xipe Totec's temple where their hearts would be removed, their bodies dismembered, and their body parts divided up to be later eaten. Prior to death and dismemberment, the victim's skin would be removed and worn by individuals who traveled throughout the city fighting battles and collecting gifts from the citizens.

== Aztecs' Conversion to Christianity ==
With the Spanish conquest, there was a great effort to convert Aztecs to Catholicism. Through fear, threat of capital punishment, and boarding schools for young Aztecs, the Spanish tried to enforce worship of the Christian God. The Spanish attempted to gut the Aztec religion by abolishing human sacrifice and worship of the war gods. They also destroyed temples, and suppressed public worship. While this was largely done through force, the cult of the war god died after the defeat of Tenochtitlan—their belief in the protection of Huitzilopochtli fading after the defeat. But when adult Aztecs did not adopt Christianity, the Spanish turned to converting Aztec children, removing them from their parents and putting them under the strict authority of monks. This created a generational conflict. Some Aztec children actively participated in the destruction of Aztec temples, pushing for their parents to convert to Christianity.

However, it wasn’t until the arrival of Franciscan monks that the entire population began to convert. The Franciscan monks adopted Aztec song and dance into their services by giving them Christian themes. Their attempt to incorporate Aztec religion led to religious syncretism, where the two religions began to mix. Aztecs began to worship saints in the same way that they might have worshipped patron deities. They began to do pilgrimages to pilgrimage centers often set over old Aztec religious sites, and adopted a sort of polytheism surrounding the Christian saints.

This mixing of religion became even more clear when Juan Diego saw the Marian apparition, the Virgin of Guadalupe. While this is often seen as the turning point where the Aztecs finally adopted Christianity, the worship of the Virgin of Guadalupe highly paralleled that of the major Aztec deities. Guadalupe was seen to protect children and punish the errant, just as old Aztec gods had done, and Aztecs created shrines and sacrificed objects to her. In fact, even now the worship of the Virgin of Guadalupe is reminiscent of old Aztec practices. While Catholicism did dominate, Aztec religious values are seen in Central America even today. For instance, the popular holiday Dia De Los Muertos still highlights Aztec ideas of the afterlife and ancestors.

== See also ==
- Aztec philosophy
- Aztec use of entheogens
- Maya religion
- Mesoamerican mythology
- Muisca religion
- Santa Muerte (Mictecacihuatl reincarnate)
