= Huey Tecuilhuitl =

Eighth month of the Aztec calendar

Huey Tecuilhuitl also called Uey Tecuilhuitl is the name of the eighth month of the Aztec calendar. It is also a festival in the Aztec religion dedicated to Xilonen and Cihuacoatl. It is called the Great festival of the Lords.
