= Pānquetzaliztli =

Name of an Aztec festival and month

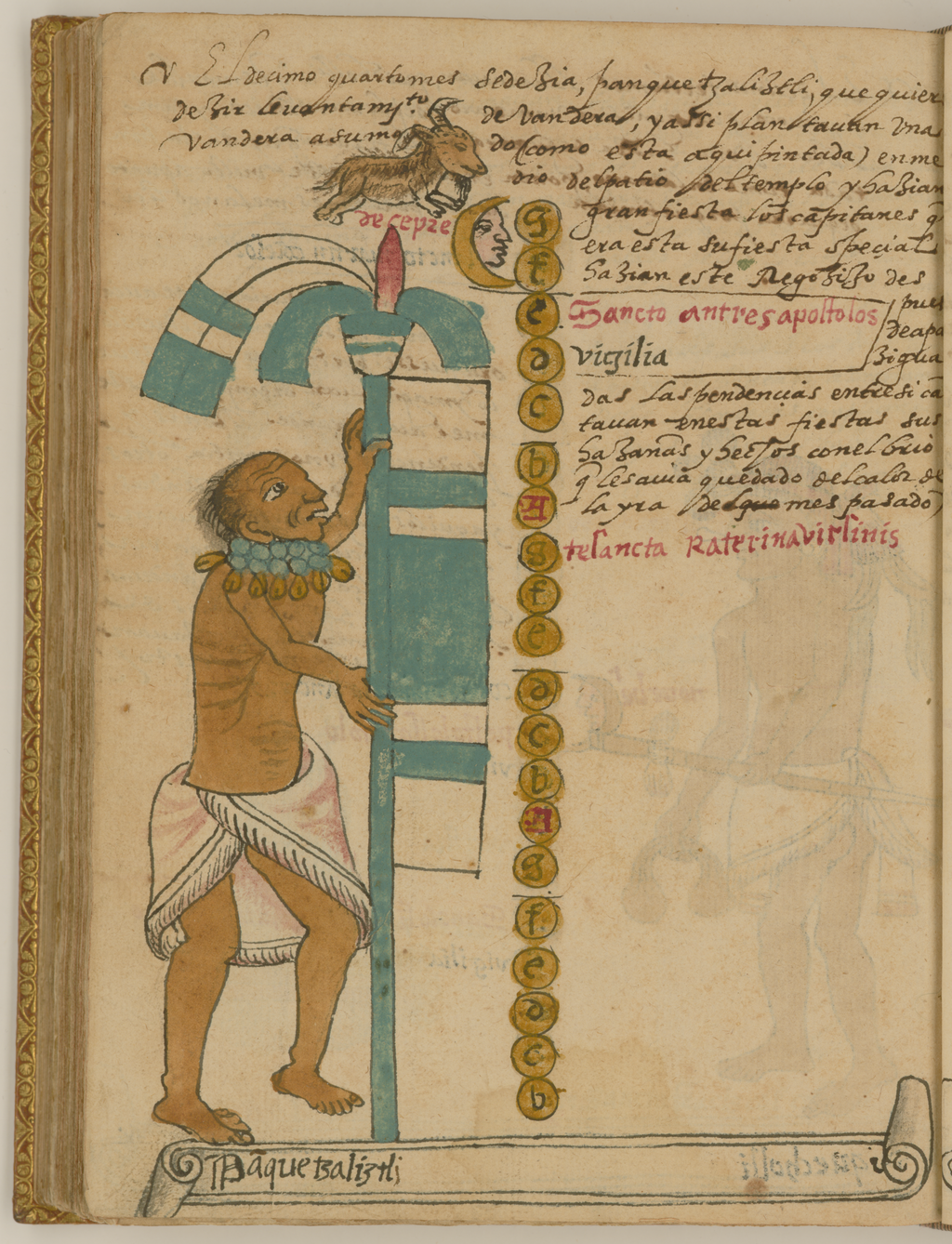

Panquetzaliztli is the name of the fifteenth month of the Aztec calendar. It is also a festival in the Aztec religion dedicated to Huitzilopochtli. The correlation of Rafael Tena calculates the twenty-day month as lasting from November 20th to December 9th.
