= Huey Tozoztli =

Fourth month of the Aztec calendar

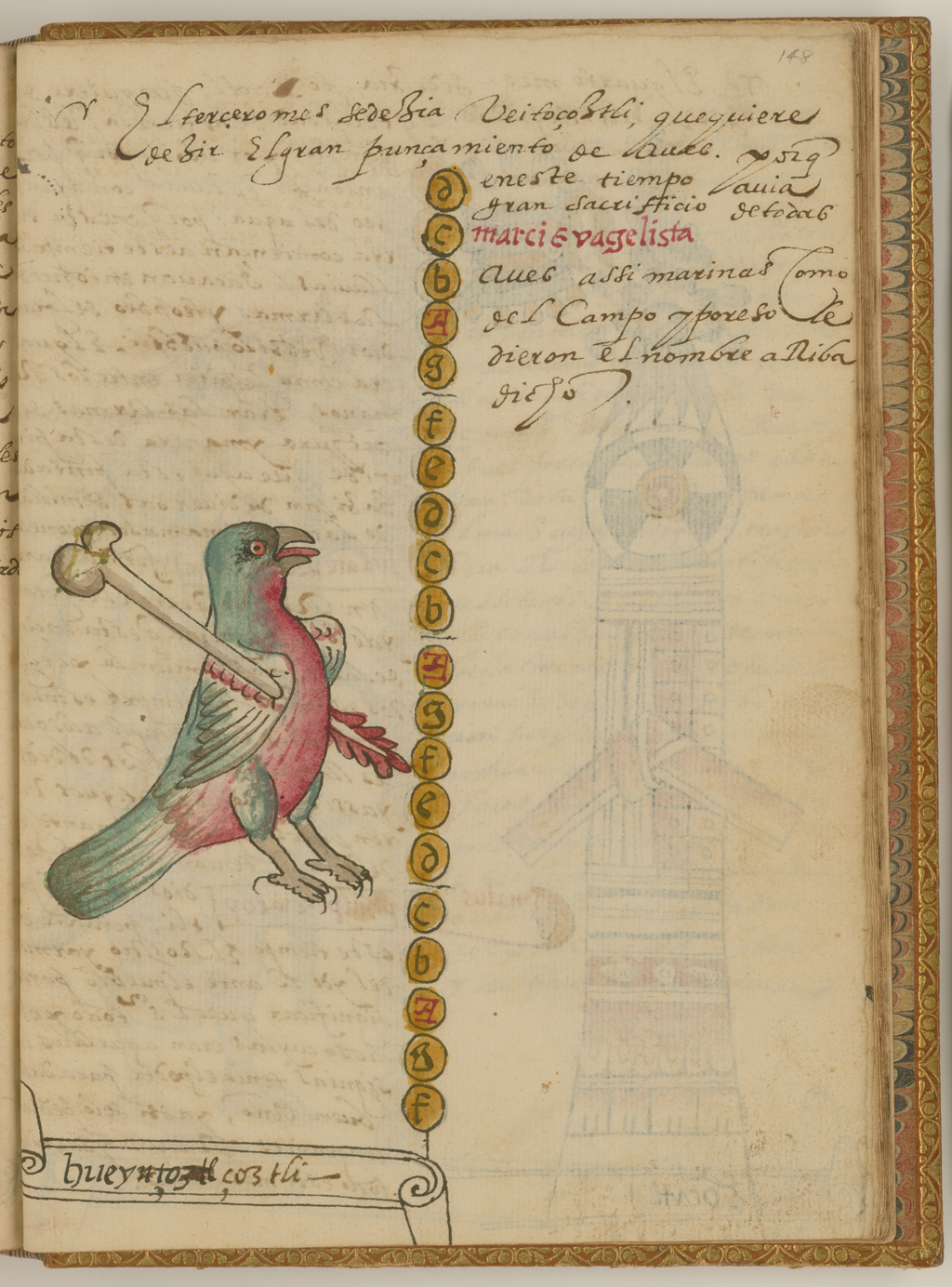
Illustration in The Tovar Codex (attributed to the 16th-century Mexican Jesuit Juan de Tovar) for the month of Hueytozoztli and its festival of bird sacrifices.

Huey Tozoztli is the name of the fourth month of the Aztec calendar. It is also a festival in the Aztec religion dedicated to Tlaloc and other deities. It is called the great or long vigil.
