= Mexican Syncretism =

Combination of indigenous and Christian religious beliefs

== Mexican Syncretism Over Time ==
In Pre-Columbian Mexico, there were many cultures that made up what came to be known as the Aztecs and Mayans. Each people had certain traditions to venerate the god that was the patron of their town. With the arrival of the Spaniards, Christianity was brought. One of the popular ways to convert was to syncretize their culture, religion, and values with that of Spain's. After converting to Catholicism, their form of practicing it brought a unique way to do so. It would reach a global audience and to this day, there are modern ways of syncretism.

Looking at contemporary Mexican society,

== Pre-Columbian life ==
The Mayans worshipped many gods. To honor them, they would build temples and make icons of them. They saw the gods played a role in their everyday conscience, activities, and nature. The Mayan sat in southern Mexico in what is known as the Yucatan Peninsula. Alongside worshipping gods, they would burn incense to ancestors. They would express their philosophies stone monuments and had a written system. The Mayans didn't have one unified religion, but worship was regional. Different cities and tribes focused on worshiping different gods. The major gods were gods that most tribes believed or worshipped in. But each town had a patron god that the town's main devotion was to.

The Aztecs were situated in Central Mexico. They adopted many traits from the Mayans and Teotihuacans. Their writing wasn't glyphs like the Mayan, but was instead pictorial representations pained on bark paper and animal hides. Their main codexes consisted of historical accounts, ritual almanacs, and tribute records. The Aztecs were divided into different ethnic groups. The Mexica were the main group since they were the governing body at the capital. Due to the Mexica ruling the different groups, there was more common expression in culture, religion, economy, and social and political institutions. Like the Mayans, they were polytheistic and each town had a patron god the town was dedicated to.

When the Spaniards came, they wrote down as much as they could since the indigenous people didn't all have a unified writing system. That way, they were able to understand the beliefs of the locals and thus, aid in the syncretism process. The Spaniards also built cities over the top of the ruins of conquered Aztec cities.

== Gods and saints ==
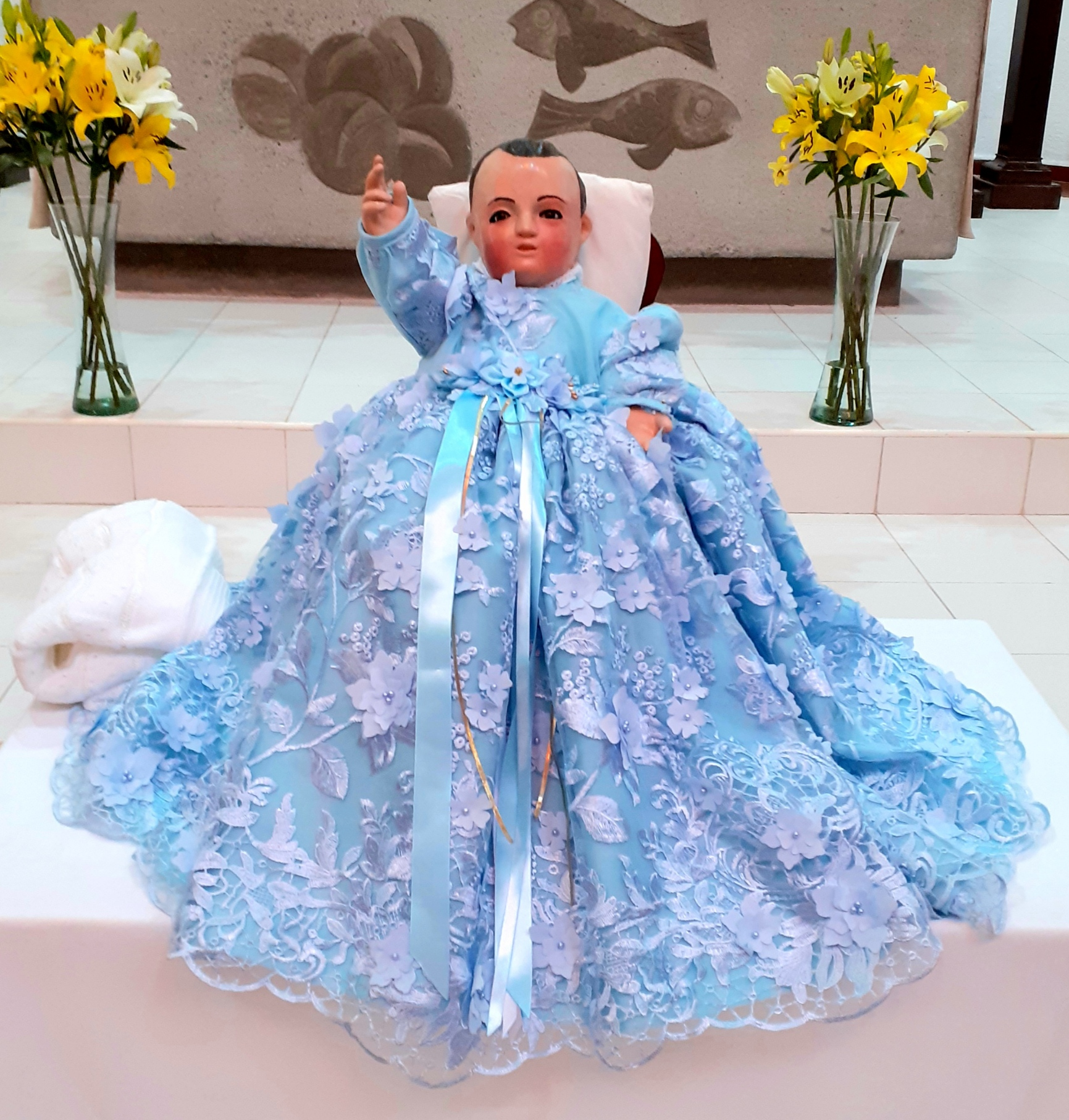
The Niñopa figure from Xochimilico

=== Tlaloc and Niñopa ===
Xochimilco was a farming village in the Pre-Columbian age. Its main sources of farming was on chinampas. It was a village also that honored many gods such as Cihuacoatl and Mictlancihuatl. Purity was also very honored as they had legends about virgins that would appear in the village. In the la laguna de Tillan, there is a spring of water where the locals would place offerings of atole and tamales. The villages main devotion was to Tlaloc, who was the patron god of Xochimilco.

With the arrival of Christianity, many of the devotions to the gods transitioned into Saint Veneration. The Spaniards introduced an icon of the Christ Child, forming the basis of veneration to it. The locals of Xochimilco called him Niñopa, a combination of Spanish word for child (niño) and the Nahuatl word for place (pa). Niñopa is believed to be a protector against floods. The Niñopa is venerated in the homes of the locals, and is the patron of Xochimilco. Families can host the icon for a day in their homes as a guest by their request.

With the new found religion, the veneration once tied to their female deities transitioned into other prominent female saints. For two weeks in February and March, there are parties and festivals held in honor of the Virgin of Sorrows. Some weeks before December 12, locals gather together to make a pilgrimage to the Basilica of Guadalupe to arrive on the day of her feast.

=== The Three Gods of Yum and the Three Wise Men ===
Tizimín is a village located in the Yucatan Peninsula. Prior to the arrival of Christianity, the patron gods were Los Tres Dioses Yum (The Three Gods of Yum). The gods were Yum Chac (the god of rain), Yum Kaax (god of maize), and Yum Ik (god of the wind). These were important gods that were group together due to their importance in the gifts they brought. Yum Chac (commonly known as Chaac) was the god that made it possible to have great harvests due to him allowing rain to water the crops. Yum Kaax was responsible for providing farmers the best crops.

When Timizin was colonized, the friars oversaw evangelizing the indigenous people. Seeing as the village venerated a trio, they tried to find a trio within the saints to find a good replacement. They chose Los Tres Reyes Magos (The three wisemen) because they were a trio associated with gift giving like the Yum gods. With the success of having converts venerate the Wise Men as the patron saints of Timizin, the temple that was once dedicated to the gods, became the grounds for the building of the Cathedral dedicated to the wisemen. This became the ground works for celebrating the epiphany in Mexico.

=== Tonantzin and the Virgin of Guadalupe ===
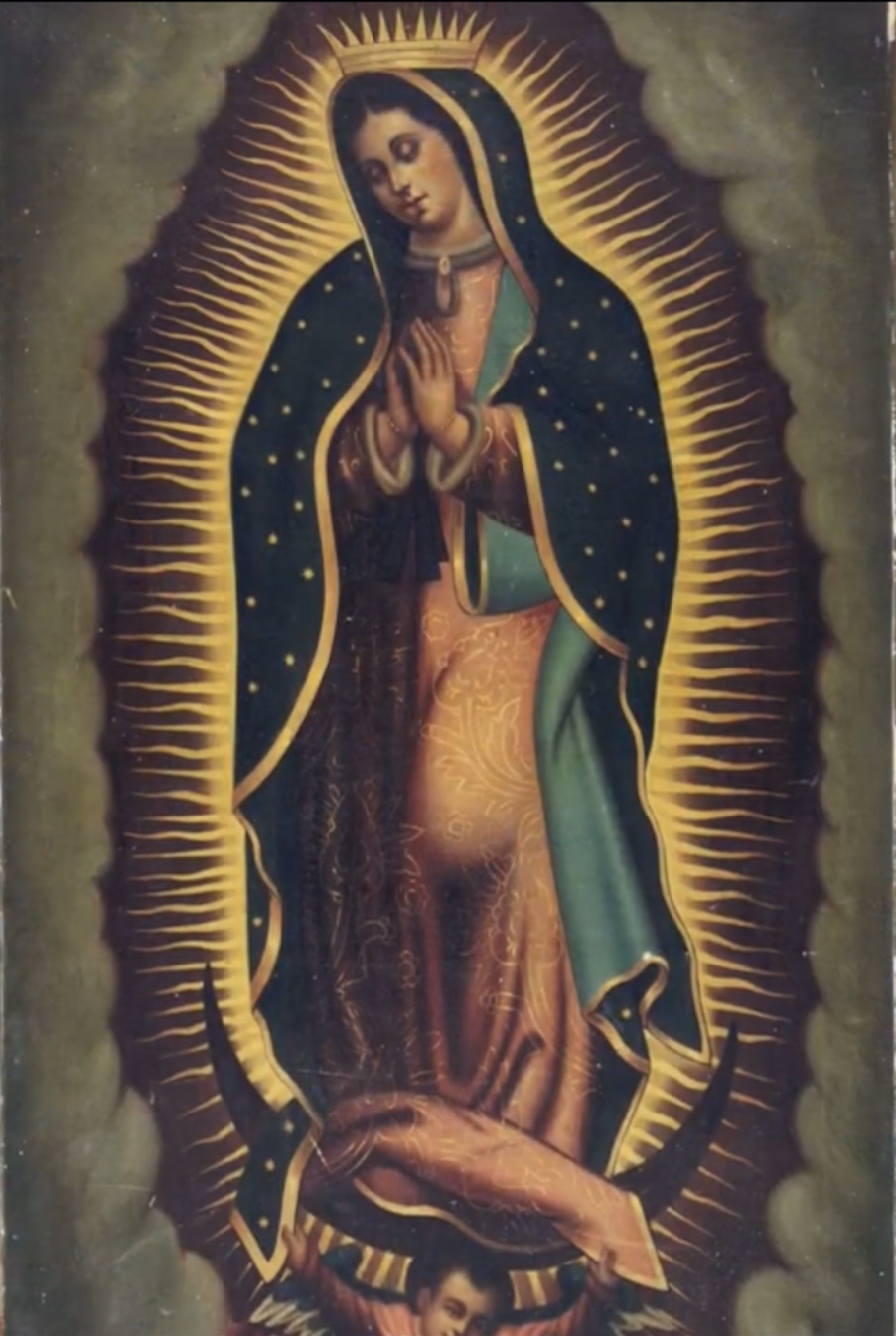
The Virgin of Guadalupe

Mount Tepeyac served as the pilgrimage site dedicated to earth goddesses, who were generally given the name Tonantzin, meaning "our revered mother." Due to it being a sacred site, missionaries deemed it logical to build a chapel there for the Virgin Mary. Just like Tonantzin was seen as the mother over the people, Christians also hold that the Virgin Mary is the spiritual mother of all. After the Virgin of Guadalupe was introduced, locals still called Mary Tonatzin, transferring the title once associated with their Pre-Columbian goddesses to Mary. Devotion to Guadalupe became big due to her dark skin being brown like the natives, which appealed to them.

=== Telpochtli and John the Baptist ===
With the arrival of the Spaniards, the Franciscan Priests explored many villages, one of them being Tulancingo. While there, they saw that the patron god of the village was Telpochtli. The Franciscans hoped to convert the natives. They built cathedrals in previous towns they visited. They studied the culture and religion to find ways and reasons on the saints chosen to sync with gods based on some common traits. Their plan was to make John the Baptist the new patron of Tulancingo. One of the reasons he was chosen was that his feast days coincided with the dates the patron god was celebrated. The devotion from Telpochitli to John the Baptist was gradual. Originally, the locals started by calling him San Juan Telpochtili, (replacing Bautista with Telpochtli).

With conversion happening, sacred sites were built such as a cathedral. They were inhabited by clergy and the leader would lead the community both on communal and political affairs. In Spain, John the Baptist's feast day commemorated all the events of his life, and as such, brought those celebrations to Mexico. Years went by and John the Baptist's devotion inspired an art form called "arte Tequitqui" which blended European and Meso-American art. With growing devotion, the title of St John Telpochtli was dropped for St John the Baptist (San Juan Bautista)

=== Quetzalcoatl and Jesus Christ ===
Quetzalcoatl was a prominent god of Aztec religion, secondary only to Huitzilopchtili, Tezcatlipoca, and Tlaloc. He was also known to be a human ruler for a time, during which he established fasts, disbanded human sacrifice, and prohibited war, robberies, and murders. He took a more peaceful approach than other gods. He was appealed as the creator of heaven, earth, and the universe, which coincided with Jesus creating everything. He was also called the "Giver of Life" and "The Preserver of Life". When he died, he is believed to have dwelt in Mictlán, but reappeared as the feathered serpent, making him a god. There was a prophecy that Quetzalcoatl would return, which the missionaries claimed that it alluded to the Second Coming of Jesus.

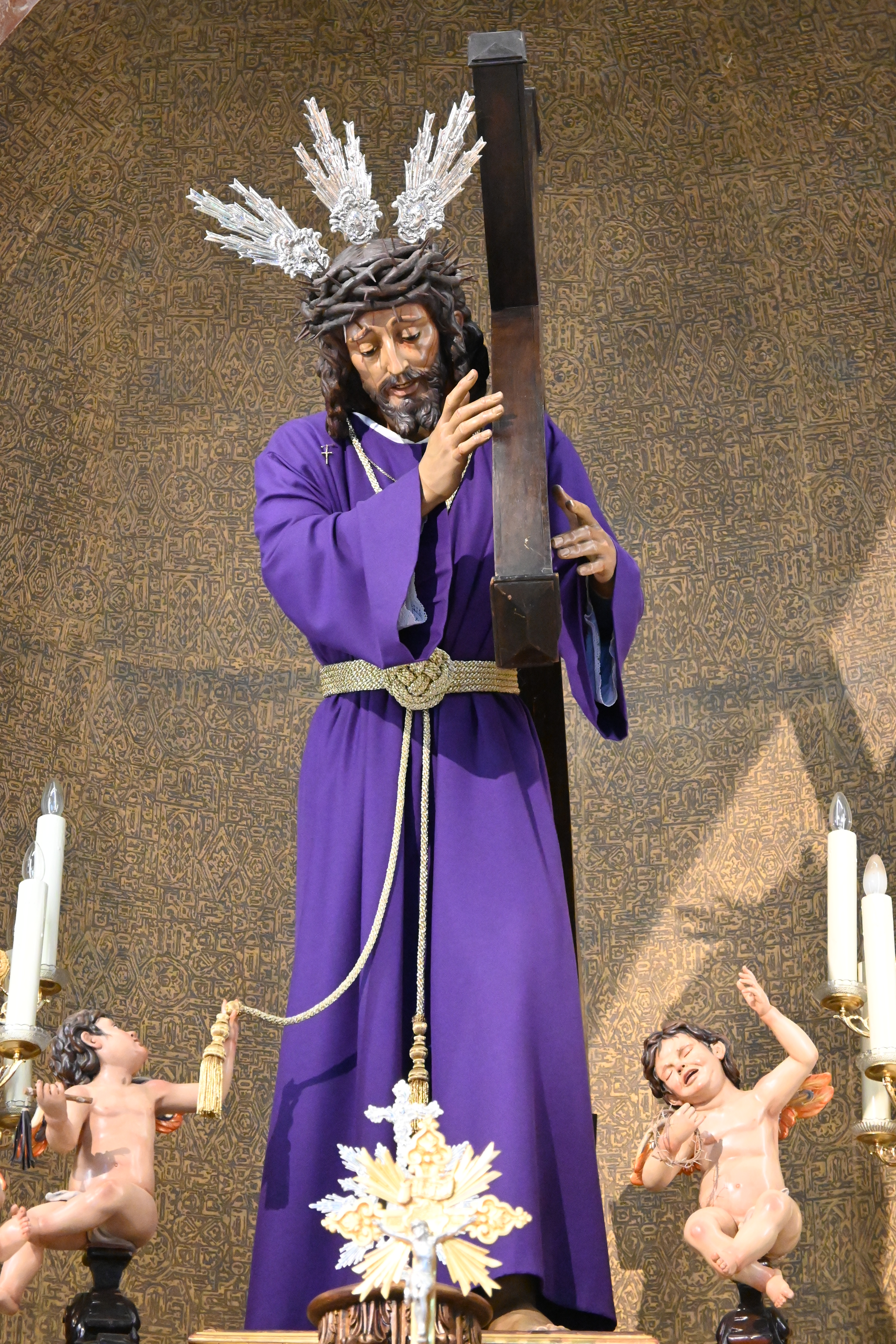
Statue of Jesus at the Hospital de Jesus in Mexico City

When the priests were trying to understand Aztec religion, they compared Quetzalcoatl to Jesus Christ due to Jesus being the god of Christianity. The missionaries took charge in assisting natives in syncing elements of Quetzalcoatl with that of the Church. One such way was portraying Hernan Cotes as a Christ-like deity who returned to his throne, making him seem like it was Cortes's divine duty to conquer Mexico.

When Cortes and his army arrived at Texcoco, they taught the locals the creation, the fall, the trinity, the passion, and resurrection of Christ. Cortes then drew out a crucifix and the locals bowed to it. This led to him explaining baptism and that he was sent by Emperor Charles to save their souls. This led to the people of Texoco to start embracing Christianity, many got baptized. When Cortes met Montezuma, Cortes hoped to convert him. Cortes also spoke against human sacrifice, and asked to build a cross on top of the temple with an image of the Virgin Mary. Though denied at first, Montezuma would come to agree to it.

After establishing Spanish authority in Tenochtitlán, more missionaries were brought into the land. The missionaries would draw or carve images and objects that had similar names to appeal to the locals. The missionaries noticed that part of human sacrifice was eating vital organs of sacrificial victims or dough meant to symbolize organs. As such, the missionaries related this to Holy Communion and taught it to the locals. The locals also did a ritual washing to remove supposed filth of sexual activity of parents, which the missionaries related to baptism and confession for cleansing original sin and coming unto Quetzalcoatl, later called Jesus. The missionaries also noticed that Quetzalcoatl's priests were celibate, making a connection to the 12 Apostles.

=== Oztoteotl and Christ of Chalma ===
The town of Chalma had a cave that would often be difficult to access. The cave was a sacred place that honored the god named Oztoteotl, who was the patron god of the town. Chalma's etymology likely comes from chalili and matia, when combined can mean caves at hand. Although now known as Chalma, it was more likely called Oztoteotl prior to the arrival of the Spaniards. It was believed that a sacred statue of Oztotreotl resided in the cave, making it hard to access since it was seen as the god's house. The statue was said to have been resting on an altar, and the statue was big and colored black, having incense on the alter. The locals would travel far away from their homes to come talk to Oztoteotl at his cave and ask for favors. The cave represented origins, birth, and fertility. It also represented the entrance to the part of the underworld where Tezcatlipoca resided, and where the waters that Tlaloc gave originated from. It was also believed that several spirits resided that cured illness. The locals would perform rituals and dances around the sacred site.

When the Augustinian Monks came, they explored the cave to know how to appeal to the locals. Though it wasn't successful at-first, they believed a miracle would solve it. The natives found their statue in pieces and was replaced by a statute of Jesus on the cross, and his skin was colored black just like the Oztoteotl statue. Some believe that the missionaries broke the statue and placed the crucifix there, while others believe that it was a miracle, that God placed the crucifix there.

With conversion now happening, the Augustinian Monks were able to begin their syncretism efforts. Starting with the cave, a church was built on there called El Santurio de Chalma. The patron thus became Jesus, who was given the name Christ of Chalma. The people of Chalma had the belief that Oztoteotl cleansed them of filth, and the festival associated with the god happened around the same time as Ash Wednesday. Ash Wednesday is seen as a time of fasting and reflection from being cleansed of sin. For this reason, was Ash Wednesday and Oztoteotl's cleansing days was synced, leading to widespread celebration of Ash Wednesday. Much of the honor that was given to Oztotetotl is now given to the crucifix. People form allover come to dance for the icon, drop off flowers, or to get holy water from there. Festivals are also held in honor of the icon, and even hymns are made.

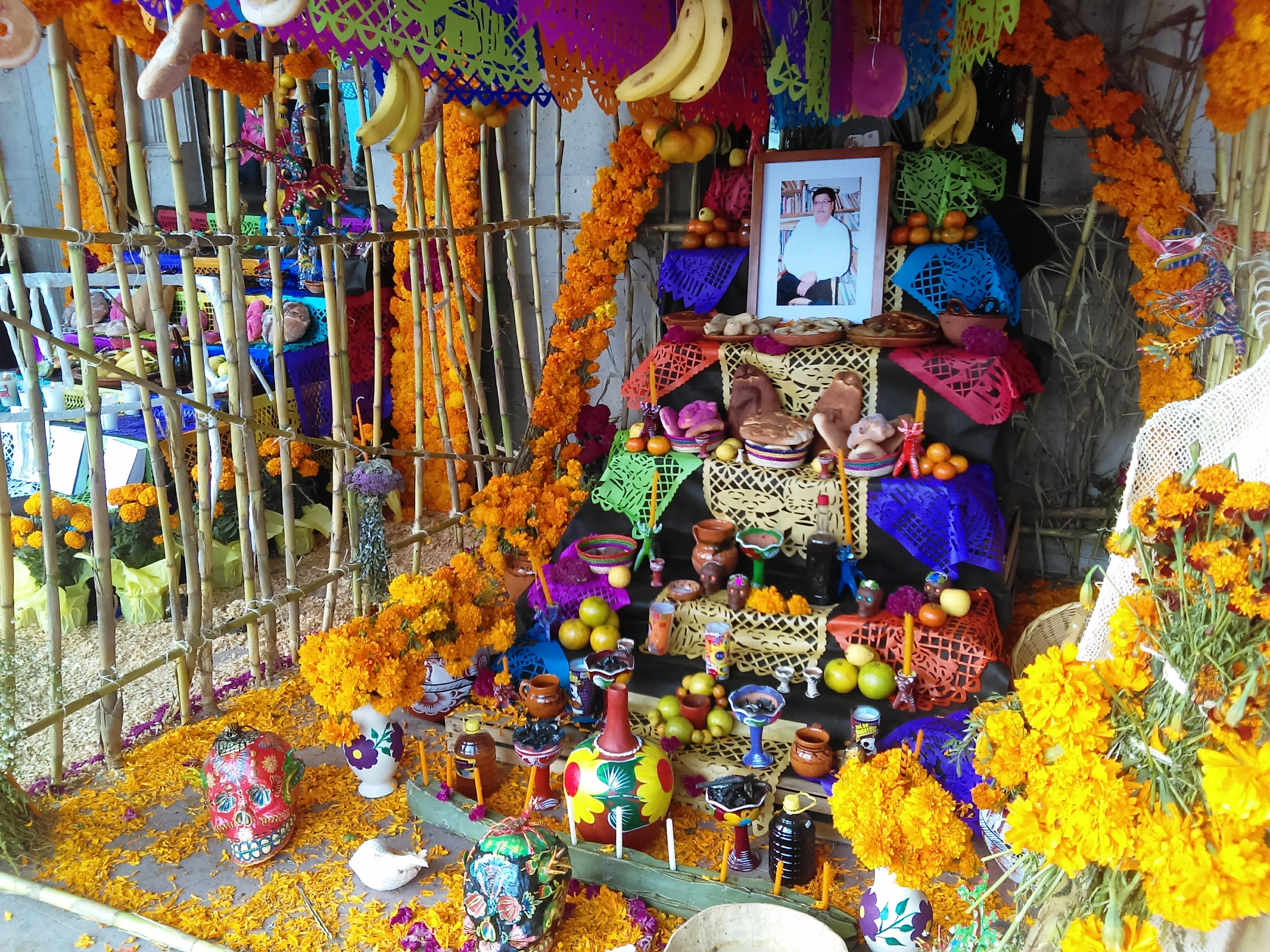
An Alter that has offerings for the deceased ancestor. Used on Day of the Dead

== Day of the Dead and All Saints Day ==
Death was heavily honored in Pre-Columbian Mexico. The Toltec and Aztecs displayed skulls of warriors on what was known as tzompantlis. Celebrations of death varied among tribes and cities. At Teotihuacan, skulls and skeletons were used for aesthetic and design of the buildings. But Teotihucan still used other ways to symbolize death by adding perorated disk and rings above their eyes and foreheads. Gods of death were also central to their devotion and aer. Coatlicue was the goddess of earth, life, and death, and was commonly depicted with a skull face. Tenochititlan had offerings of skulls and skeletons to the gods.

In Europe, Christians who died for defending their faith would be called martyrs. Stories of martyrs brought European communities together and would celebrate and honor the life of these people, forming the basis for Saint Veneration. Pope Gregory III built a chapel within the old St. Peter's Bascilica in 732. This was made with the hopes of making a day to venerate every saints regardless if they died a martyr. This holiday is called All Saints Day. With the arrival of Christianity in Mexico. the locals would mix the elements of celebrating death with that of All Saints Day, leading to a holiday honoring deceased ancestors known as Day of the Dead. The alters that are given to saints were also given to deceased relatives of people, and are decorated with skulls made of sugar called calaveras.

== Modern syncretism ==
=== Aztlan ===
The Nahuatl people claimed to trace their ancestry to a place called Aztlan. Aztlan stories varied among tribes, but the common consensus is that they came from the north direction and settled into what is known as Tenochitlian. This became the formation of the Mexica people. Many scholars see Aztlan as mythical place that is part of the belief system rather than a literal place. It is a manner of debate where Aztlan could be. Stories of Aztlan would be shared orally among generations. Aztlan was also seen as the place many gods dwelt.

The Chicano activists derived their name from Mexica, the ruling tribe of the Aztec Empire. The name was chosen to symbolically represent their cultural roots. The Chicano movement while focused on worker's right was also focused on embracing their mixed ancestry, commonly known as mestizaje. Among the activists, they saw it as a promised land, serving as a spiritual unity needed to bring everyone together in the movement. It also became the symbol of cultural pride.

=== The Book of Mormon ===
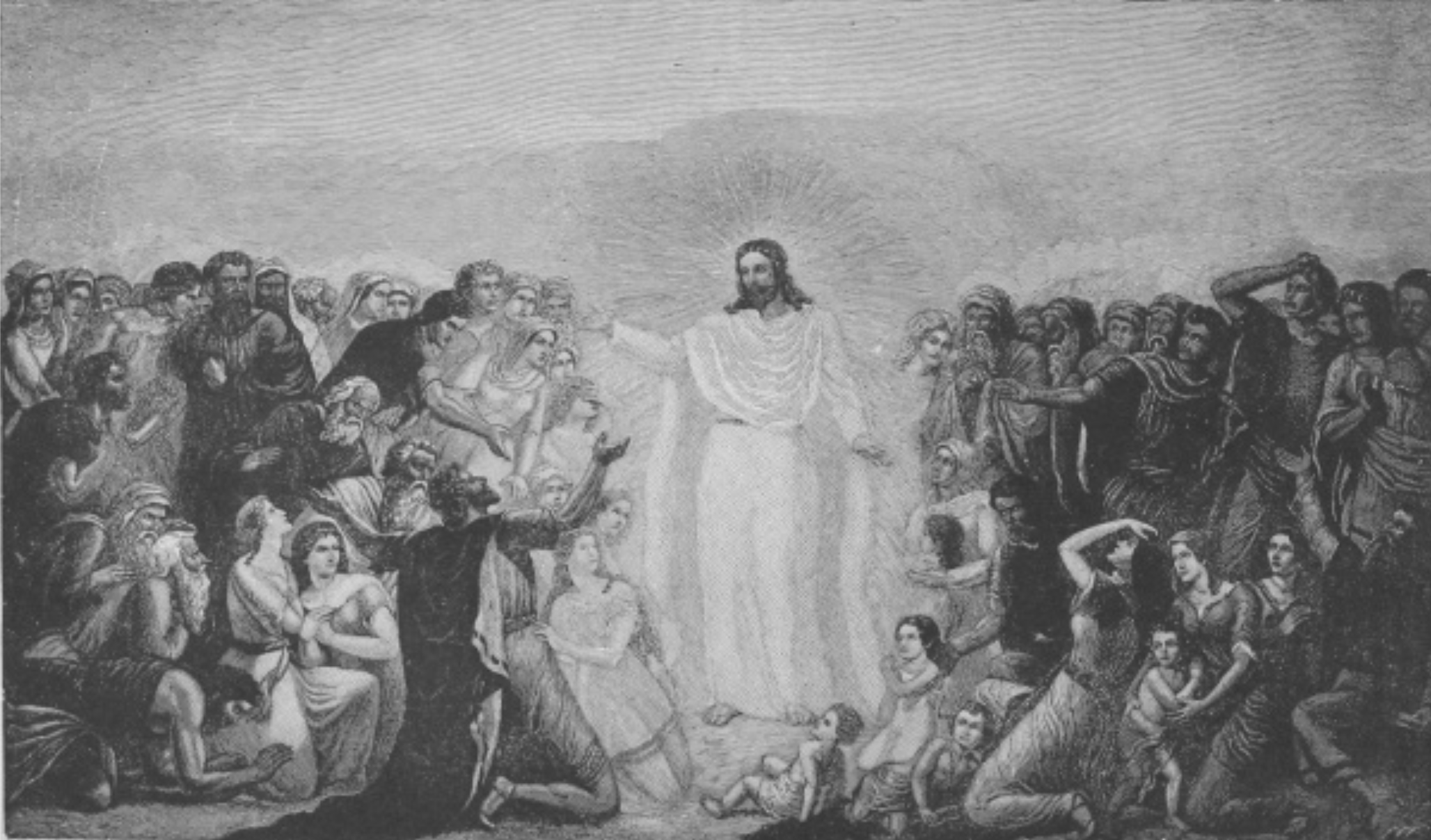
A depiction of Jesus visiting the Nephites, an event from the Book of Mormon

With the spread of Mormonism in Mexico, many members both in Mexico and outside of Mexico make correlations between the events of the Book of Mormon and the Pre-Columbian societies. The Book of Mormon describes events like Jesus visiting the Americas, wars between two rival tribes called Lamanites and Nephities, and advanced cities. Some members make the association of the Maya being the Nephites and the Olmec being the Jaredites. Some people even associate certain Meso-American cities with those in the Book of Mormon. Joseph Smith speculated that Palenque was a Nephite City. Mormon art embraces these connections such as having Christ visiting the Nephites at a temple decorated with Chaac, or the Testaments movie depicting the Book of Mormon as being set in the classical Mayan period. Although not agreed by scholars, some members still believe the Book of Mormon and Meso-American societies to be one and the same.

== Impact and legacy ==
The adoption of saints as being patrons to towns in Mexico has become an integral part of Mexican culture. Every day, there's a festival somewhere in Mexico dedicated to a saint, Mary, Jesus, or the sacred heart. Dances are also made in honor of them. The entire town, as a whole, volunteers to honor the patron to show respect. Some regions of Mexico still call Guadalupe Tonantzin.

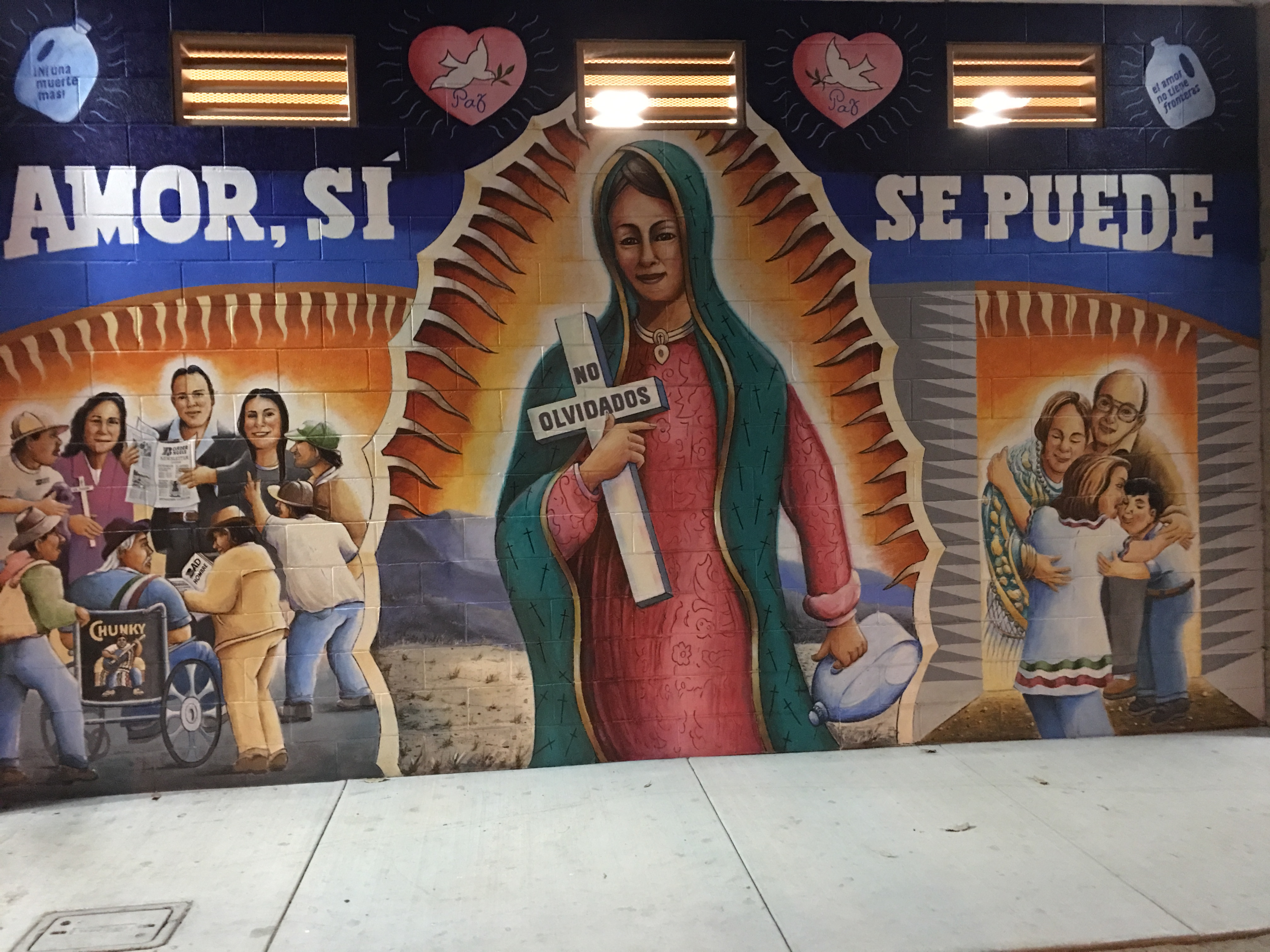
A mural of the Virgin of Guadalupe in San Diego

The Christ of Chalma's impact has even reached Christians outside of Mexico. The hymns once made for the Christ of Chalma has become songs Christians sing on Holy Week. Corpus Christi also sings the hymns during their Christian celebrations.

Due to how ingrained the old culture was with the people of Mexico, syncing both cultures became a big part of Mexican Identity. Even when people leave Mexico and settle in America, they still retain elements of their way of honoring Christianity. When they bring their form of Christianity, many others begin embracing it. Italian Priests during the Cristero War would adopt elements of worship unique to Mexico. This also led parishes to be bilingual and bicultural. Many states in the Southwest adopted what is known as Mexican Catholicism. San Fernando Cathedral holds an image of Jesus on the cross, colored black like the Christ of Chalma. Due to their unique take, the Vatican held a council to recognize diversity within the church

== Bibliography ==
- Brandes, Stanley. “Iconography in Mexico’s Day of the Dead: Origins and Meaning” Ethnohistory 45, no. 2 (1998): 181–218.
- Camona Moreno , Felix. n.d. Review of Ferias Y Danzas En Honor Del Señor de Chalma (Mexico). Real Monasterio de El Escorial (2013)
- Carrillo, Andres. 2019. Review of Los 10 Dioses Mayas Mas Importantes de La Histoira. Piscologia Y Mente. January 2, 2019.
- Espinosa Garcia, Ana Cecilia, and Marisa Maari Hiriart. n.d. Review of Pueblos Indigenas de Mexico Y Agua: Xochimilcas. Instituto de Ecologia, UNAM. UNAM.
- Fischer de la Vega, Laura Estela . n.d. Review of La Mercadotecnia En Las Festividades Religiosas Caso: Niñopa, Xochimilco, Mexico. Facultad de Ciencias Economoicas Y Empreseriales . FACE.
- García, Mario T. “The Chicano Southwest: Catholicism and Its Meaning” U.S. Catholic Historian 18, no. 4 (2000): 1–24.
- Hartman, Steven P., "Quetzalcoatl without Jesus Christ" (1996). Graduate Student Theses, Dissertations, & Professional Papers. 5521.
- Houston, Stephen D. “Classic Maya Religion: Beliefs and Practices of an Ancient American People” Brigham Young University Studies 38, no. 4 (1999): 43–72.
- Konieczna, Barbara . 2020. Review of Deidades Prehispanicas Veneradas En Chalma. Edited by Erick Alvarado Tenorio, Giselle Canto Aguilar, Eduardo Gonzalez Quezada, Luis Miguel Morayta Mendoza, and Tania Alejandra Ramirez Roca. El Tlacuache . Instituto Nacional de Antropologia e Historia . June 19, 2020.
- Pacheco Medina, Maria Esther. n.d. Review of V. San Juan Bautista: Tesoro Del Claustro de La Catedral de Tulancingo. Instituto de Artes. Universidad Autonoma del Estado de Hidalgo.
- Peterson, J. F. (1992). The Virgin of Guadalupe: Symbol of Conquest or Liberation? Art Journal, 51(4), 39–47.
- Relationship of the Maya and the Olmec to the Lamanites and the Jaredites - FAIR 2022. Fairlatterdaysaints.org. 2022.
- Rivero Canto, Raul Enrique . 2022. Review of Los Santos Reyes Del Oriente...Del Mundo Maya. El Color de La Fe. January 6, 2022.
- Smith, Michael E. 1984. “The Aztlan Migrations of the Nahuatl Chronicles: Myth or History?” Ethnohistory 31 (3): 153–86.
- Smith, Michael E. 2006. Review of Aztec Culture: An Overview. 2006.
- Talley, Thomas J. 1994. “For All the Saints” Liturgy 12 (2): 39–46.
- Trejo, Arnulfo D. 1979. The Chicanos as We See Ourselves. University of Arizona.
