= Tepeilhuitl =

Thirteenth veintena of the xiuhpōhualli

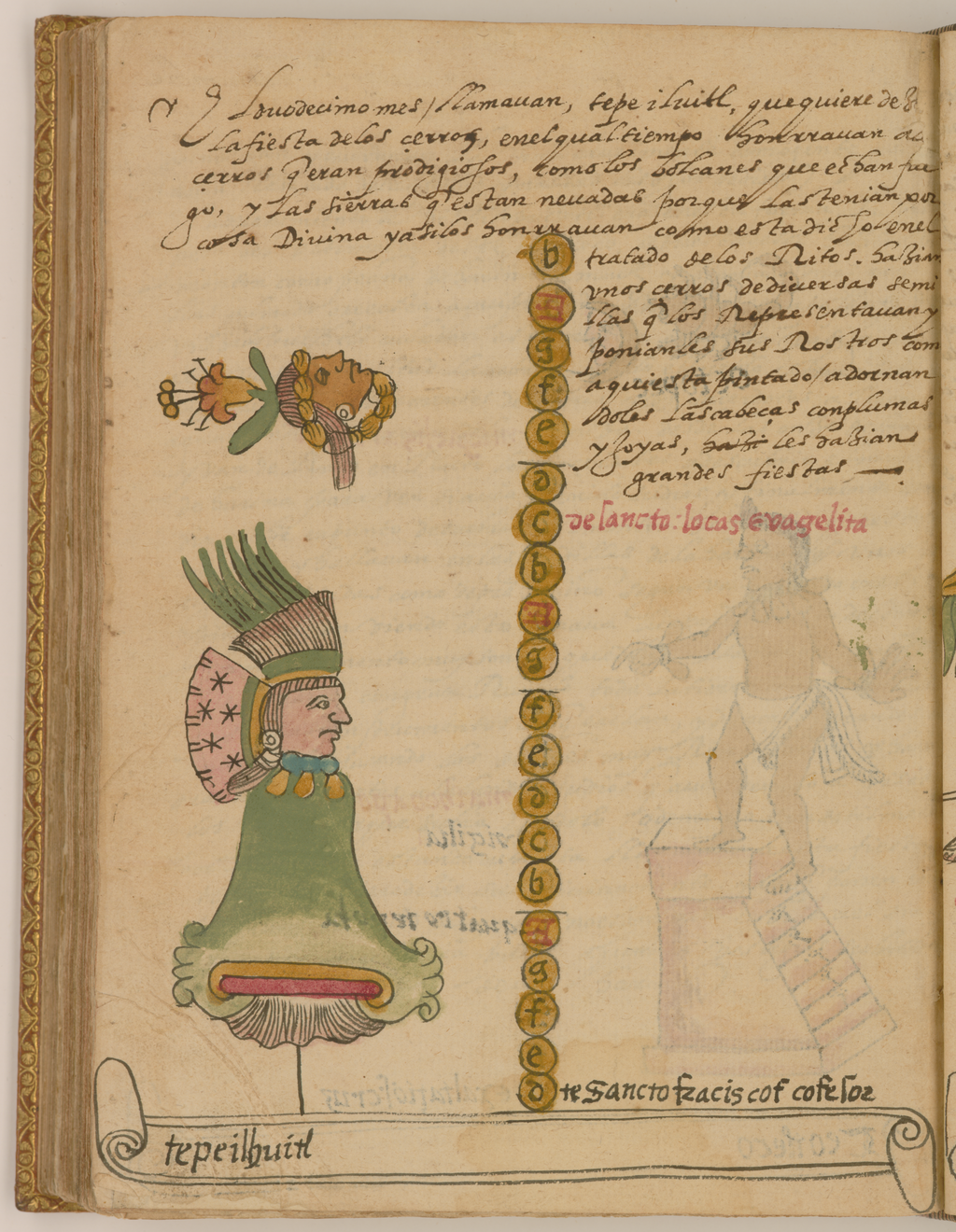
Tepeilhuitl as depicted in the Tovar Codex

Tepeilhuitl is the name of the thirteenth month of the Aztec calendar. It is also a festival in the Aztec religion dedicated to Popocatepetl, Iztaccihuatl and Tlaloc. It is called the festival or feast of the Mountains. It could also be referred to as Pachtli ("hay") or Hueypachtli "great hay").
