= Izcalli =

Eighteenth and last veintena of the xiuhpōhualli

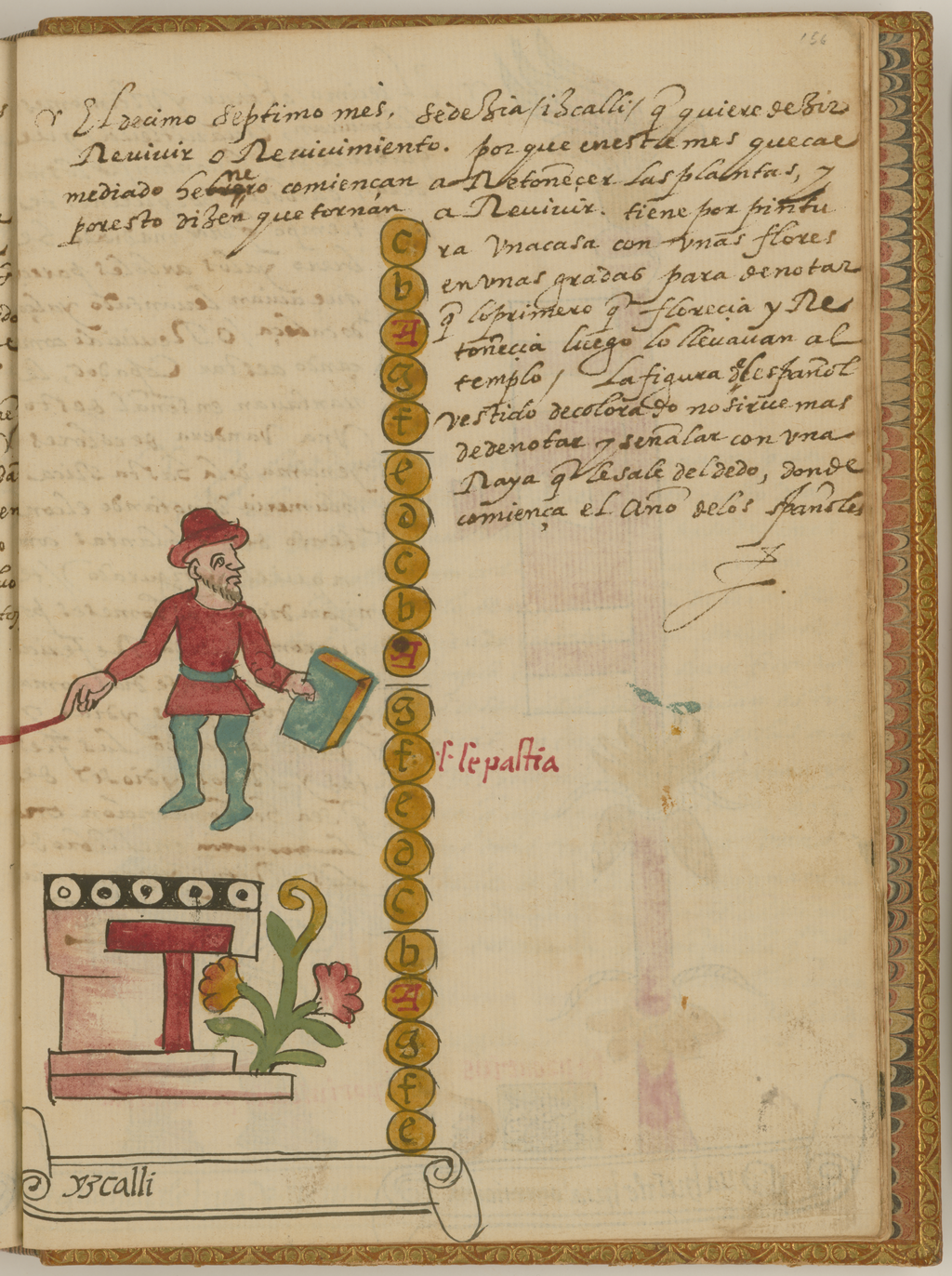

Izcalli is the name of the eighteenth and last month of the Aztec calendar. It is also a festival in the Aztec religion, for which the principal deity is Xiuhtecuhtli the fire God. Old people are honored this month and it is known as Rebirth Month.
