= Tozoztontli =

Name of an Aztec festival and month

Tozoztontli is the name of the third month of the Aztec calendar. It means Little Perforation. It is also a festival in the Aztec religion, the deities are Centeotl, Tlaloque, Chicomecoatl and Coatlicue. It marks the end of the dry season. It is the season of bird sacrifices and is called The Little Vigil.
