= Tlaxochimaco =

Name of an Aztec festival and month

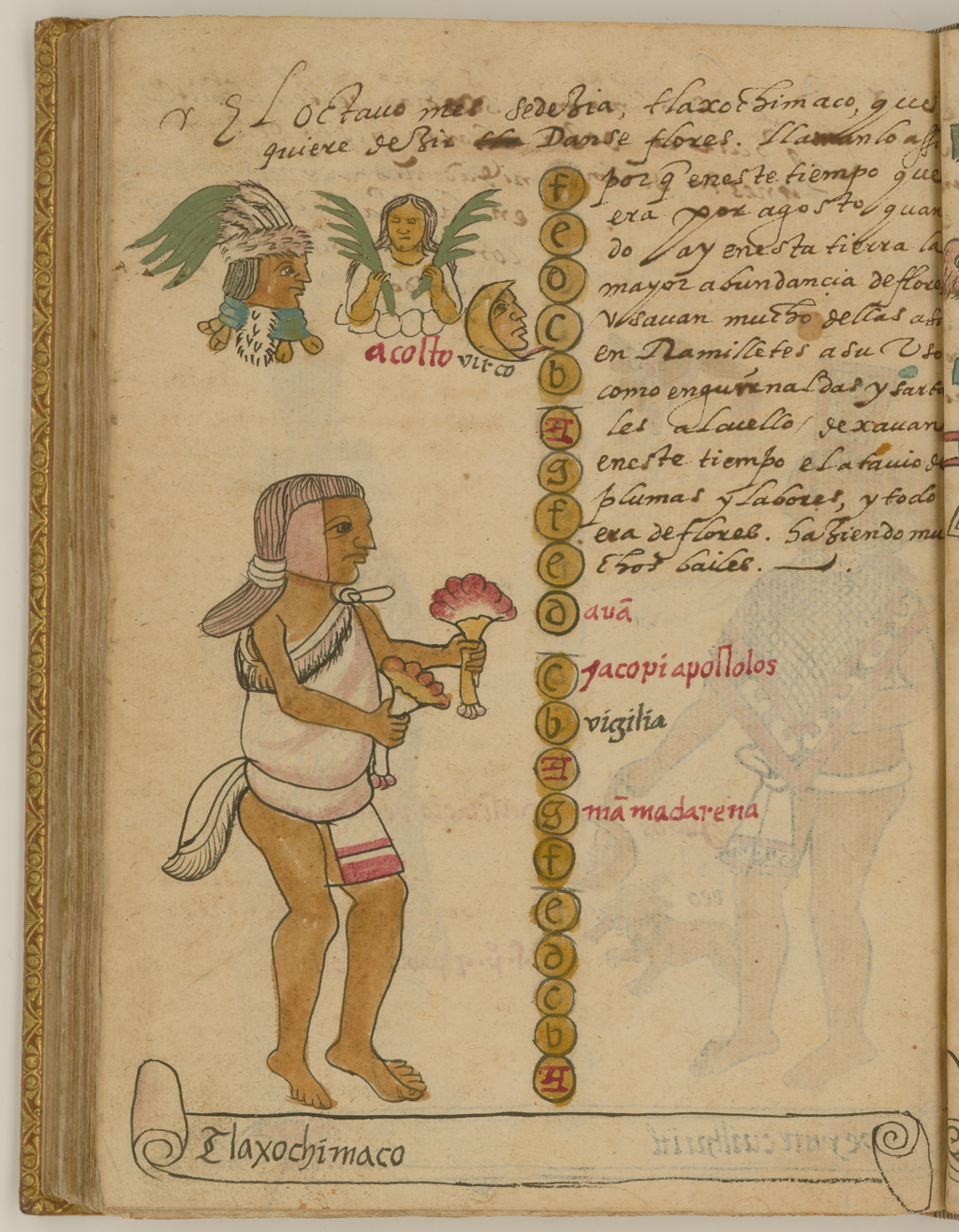

Tlaxochimaco is the name of the ninth Month of the Aztec calendar. It is also a festival in the Aztec religion, dedicated to the Aztec God of War Huitzilopochtli. It is called the Bestowal or Birth of Flowers.
