= Human sacrifice in Aztec culture =

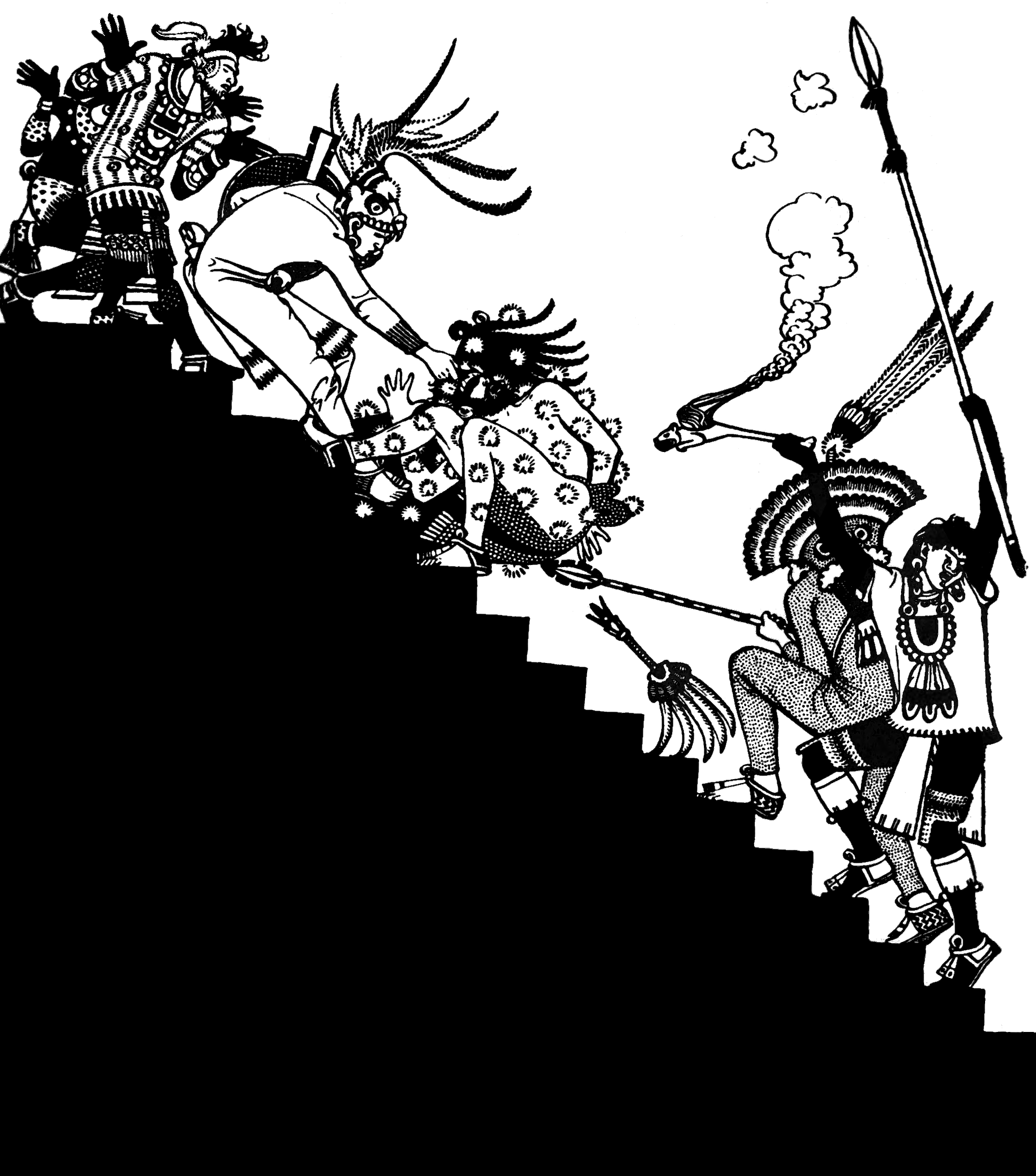
Prisoners for sacrifice were decorated.

Human sacrifice was a common practice in many parts of Mesoamerica. The rite was not new to the Aztecs when they arrived at the Valley of Mexico, nor was it something unique to pre-Columbian Mexico. Other Mesoamerican cultures, such as the Purépechas, the Toltecs, and the Maya performed sacrifices as well, and from archaeological evidence, this ritual probably existed since the time of the Olmecs (1200–400 BC), and perhaps even throughout the early farming cultures of the region. However, the extent of human sacrifice is unknown among several Mesoamerican civilizations. What distinguished Aztec practice from Maya human sacrifice was the way in which it was embedded in everyday life.

Around 1521, when the Aztec capital of Tenochtitlan fell to Hernán Cortés's troops, Cortés and other European explorers and conquistadores made observations of and wrote reports about the practice of human sacrifice. Bernal Díaz del Castillo, who participated in the Cortés expedition, made frequent mention of human sacrifice in his memoir True History of the Conquest of New Spain. There are a number of second-hand accounts of human sacrifices written by Spanish friars that relate to the testimonies of native eyewitnesses. The literary accounts have been supported by archeological research.

Since the late 1970s, excavations of the offerings in the Great Pyramid of Tenochtitlan, and other archaeological sites, have provided physical evidence of human sacrifice among the Mesoamerican peoples. As of 2020, archaeologists have found 603 human skulls at the Hueyi Tzompantli in the archeological zone of the Templo Mayor.

A wide variety of interpretations of the Aztec practice of human sacrifice have been proposed by modern scholars. Many scholars now believe that Aztec human sacrifice, especially during troubled times like pandemic or other crises, was performed in honor of the gods. Most scholars of Pre-Columbian civilization see human sacrifice among the Aztecs as a part of the long cultural tradition of human sacrifice in Mesoamerica.

== Role of sacrifice in Aztec culture ==
Sacrifice was a common theme in the Aztec culture. In the legend of the "Five Suns", all the gods sacrificed themselves so that mankind could live. Some years after the Spanish conquest of the Aztec Empire, a body of the Franciscans confronted the remaining Aztec priesthood and demanded, under threat of death, that they desist from this traditional practice. The Aztec priests justified their acts as follows: "Life is because of the gods; with their sacrifice, they gave us life ... They produce our sustenance ... which nourishes life."

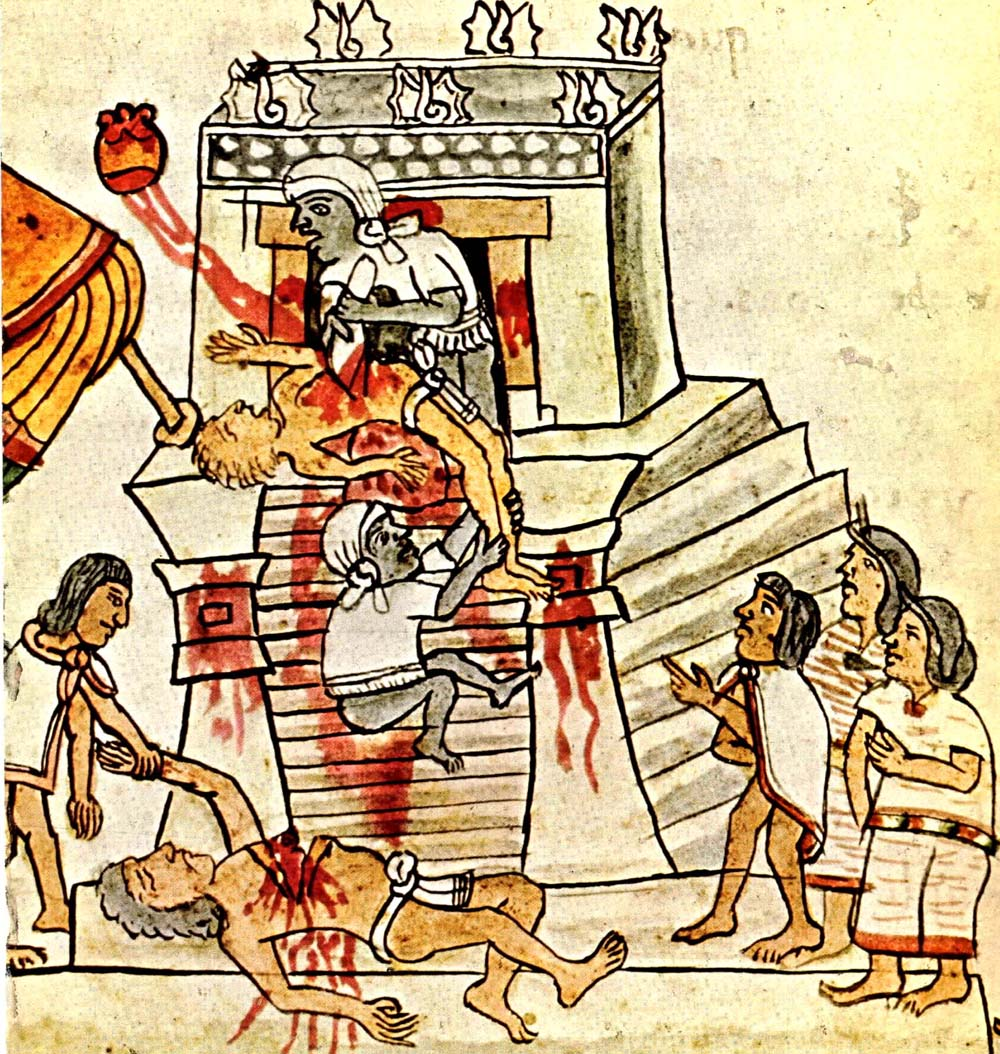
Human sacrifice as shown in the Codex Magliabechiano, Folio 70. Heart-extraction was viewed as a means of liberating the Istli and reuniting it with the sun: the victim's transformed heart flies to the sun on a trail of blood.

What the Aztec priests were referring to was a cardinal Mesoamerican belief: that a great and continuing sacrifice by the gods sustains the Universe. A strong sense of indebtedness was connected with this worldview. Indeed, nextlahualli (debt-payment) was a commonly used metaphor for human sacrifice, and, as Bernardino de Sahagún reported, it was said that the victim was someone who "gave his service".

Human sacrifice was in this sense the highest level of an entire panoply of offerings through which the Aztecs sought to repay their debt to the gods. Both Sahagún and Toribio de Benavente (also called "Motolinía") observed that the Aztecs gladly parted with everything. Even the "stage" for human sacrifice, the massive temple-pyramids, was an offering mound: crammed with the land's finest art, treasure and victims; they were then buried underneath for the deities.

Additionally, the sacrifice of animals was a common practice, for which the Aztecs bred dogs, eagles, jaguars and deer. The cult of Quetzalcoatl required the sacrifice of butterflies and hummingbirds.

Limited forms of self-sacrifice were also quite common: people would offer maguey thorns, tainted with their own blood, using blood from their tongues, ear lobes, or genitals. Blood held a central place in Mesoamerican cultures. The 16th-century Florentine Codex by Franciscan friar Bernardino de Sahagún reports that in one of the creation myths, Quetzalcóatl offered blood extracted from a wound in his own penis to give life to humanity. There are several other myths in which Nahua gods offer their blood to help humanity.

The meaning of sacrifice in Aztec society is debated. Some scholars argue that its purpose was to assist the gods in maintaining the cosmos. Another, very controversial, theory is that human sacrifice served to supply protein and vital nutrients in the absence of large animals, since the victims were often eaten.

In any case the sacrificial role entailed a great deal of social expectation and a certain degree of acquiescence.

== Flower wars ==
According to Diego Durán's History of the Indies of New Spain (and a few other sources that are believed to be based on the Crónica X), the flower wars were a ritual among the cities of Aztec Triple Alliance and Tlaxcala, Huexotzingo and Cholula. This form of ritual was introduced probably after the mid-1450s following droughts, as famine caused many deaths in the Mexican highlands. The droughts and damage to crops were believed to be punishment by gods who felt unappreciated and improperly honored. Therefore, the flower wars provided victims for human sacrificial offerings in a highly structured and ceremonial manner.

This type of warfare differed from regular political warfare, as the flower wars were also an opportunity for combat training and as first exposure to combat for new soldiers. In addition, regular warfare included the use of long range weapons such as atlatl darts, stones, and slings to damage the enemy from afar. During the flower wars, warriors were expected to fight up close and exhibit their combat abilities while aiming to injure the enemy, rather than kill them. The main objective of Aztec flower warfare was to capture victims alive for later ritual execution, and offerings to the gods. Being killed in the flower wars, which was considered much more noble than dying in a regular military battle, was religiously more prestigious, as these dead were given the privilege to live in heaven with the war god, Huitzilopochtli.

== Sacrifice ritual ==
Human sacrifice rituals were performed at the appropriate times each month or festival with the appropriate number of living bodies and other goods. These individuals were previously chosen to be sacrificed, as was the case for people embodying the gods themselves, or members of an enemy party which had been captured and prepared to be sacrificed. Even enemies of the Aztecs understood their roles as sacrifices to the gods since many also practiced the same type of religion. For many rites, the victims were expected to bless children, greet and cheer passers-by, hear people's petitions to the gods, visit people in their homes, give discourses and lead sacred songs, processions and dances.

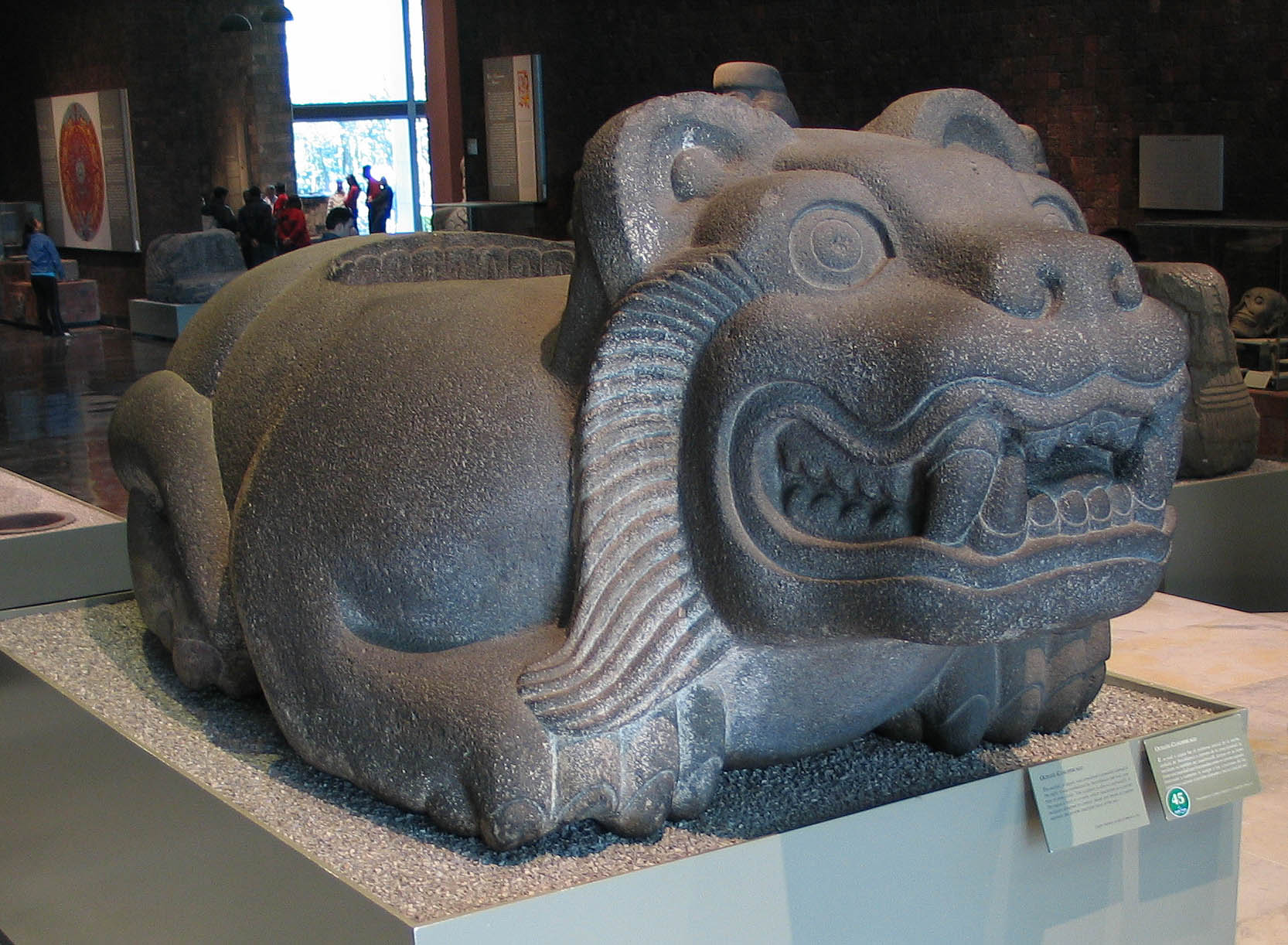
A jaguar-shaped cuauhxicalli in the National Museum of Anthropology. This altar-like stone vessel was used to hold the hearts of sacrificial victims. See also chacmool.

A great deal of cosmological thought seems to have underlain each of the Aztec sacrificial rites. Most of the sacrificial rituals took more than two people to perform. In the usual procedure of the ritual, the victim would be taken to the top of the temple. The victim would then be laid on a stone slab, a chacmool, by four priests, and their abdomen would be sliced open by a fifth priest with a ceremonial knife made of flint. The most common form of human sacrifice was heart-extraction. The Aztec believed that the heart (tona) was both the seat of the individual and a fragment of the Sun's heat (istli). The chacmool was a very important religious tool used during sacrifices. The cut was made in the abdomen and went through the diaphragm. The priest would rip out the heart and it would then be placed in a bowl held by a statue of the honored god, and the body would then be thrown down the temple's stairs. The body would land on a terrace at the base of the pyramid called an apetlatl.

Before and during the killing, priests and audience gathered in the plaza below, stabbed, pierced and bled themselves as auto-sacrifice. Hymns, whistles, spectacular costumed dances and percussive music marked different phases of the rite.

The body parts would then be disposed of, the viscera fed to the animals in the zoo, and the bleeding head was placed on display in the tzompantli or the skull rack. When the consumption of individuals was involved, the warrior who captured the enemy was given the meaty limbs while the most important flesh, the stomach and chest, were offerings to the gods.

Other types of human sacrifice, which paid tribute to various deities, killed the victims differently. The victim could be shot with arrows, die in gladiatorial style fighting, be sacrificed as a result of the Mesoamerican ballgame, burned, flayed after being sacrificed, or drowned.

Those individuals who were unable to complete their ritual duties were disposed of in a much less honorary manner. This "insult to the gods" needed to be atoned, therefore the sacrifice was slain while being chastised instead of revered. The conquistadors Cortés and Alvarado found that some of the sacrificial victims they freed "indignantly rejected [the] offer of release and demanded to be sacrificed".

== Scope of human sacrifice in Aztec culture ==
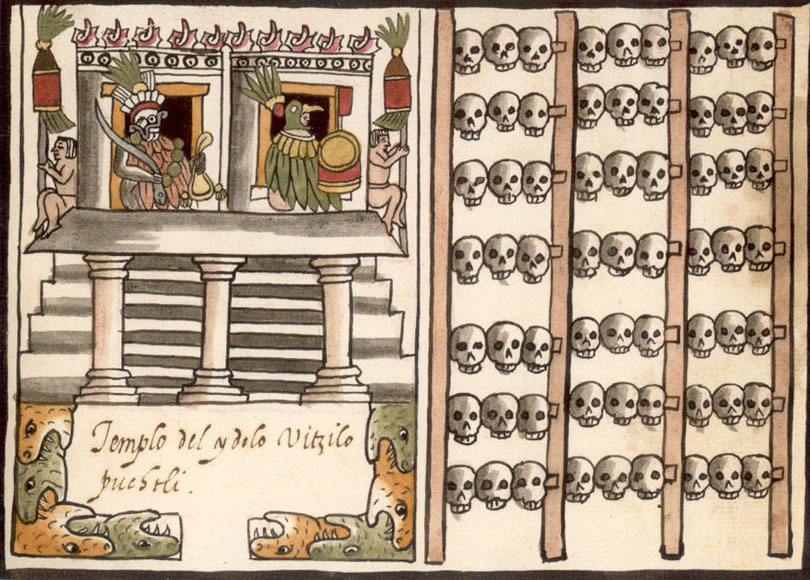
A tzompantli, or skull rack, as shown in the post-Conquest Codex Tovar

Some post-conquest sources report that at the re-consecration of Great Pyramid of Tenochtitlan in 1487, the Aztecs sacrificed about 80,400 prisoners over the course of four days. This number is considered by Ross Hassig, author of Aztec Warfare, to be an exaggeration. Hassig states "between 10,000 and 80,400 persons" were sacrificed in the ceremony. The higher estimate would average 15 sacrifices per minute during the four-day consecration. Four tables were arranged at the top so that the victims could be jettisoned down the sides of the temple. Additionally, some historians argue that these numbers were inaccurate as most written account of Aztec sacrifices were made by Spanish sources to justify Spain's conquest. Nonetheless, according to Codex Telleriano-Remensis, old Aztecs who talked with the missionaries told about a much lower figure for the reconsecration of the temple, approximately 4,000 victims in total.

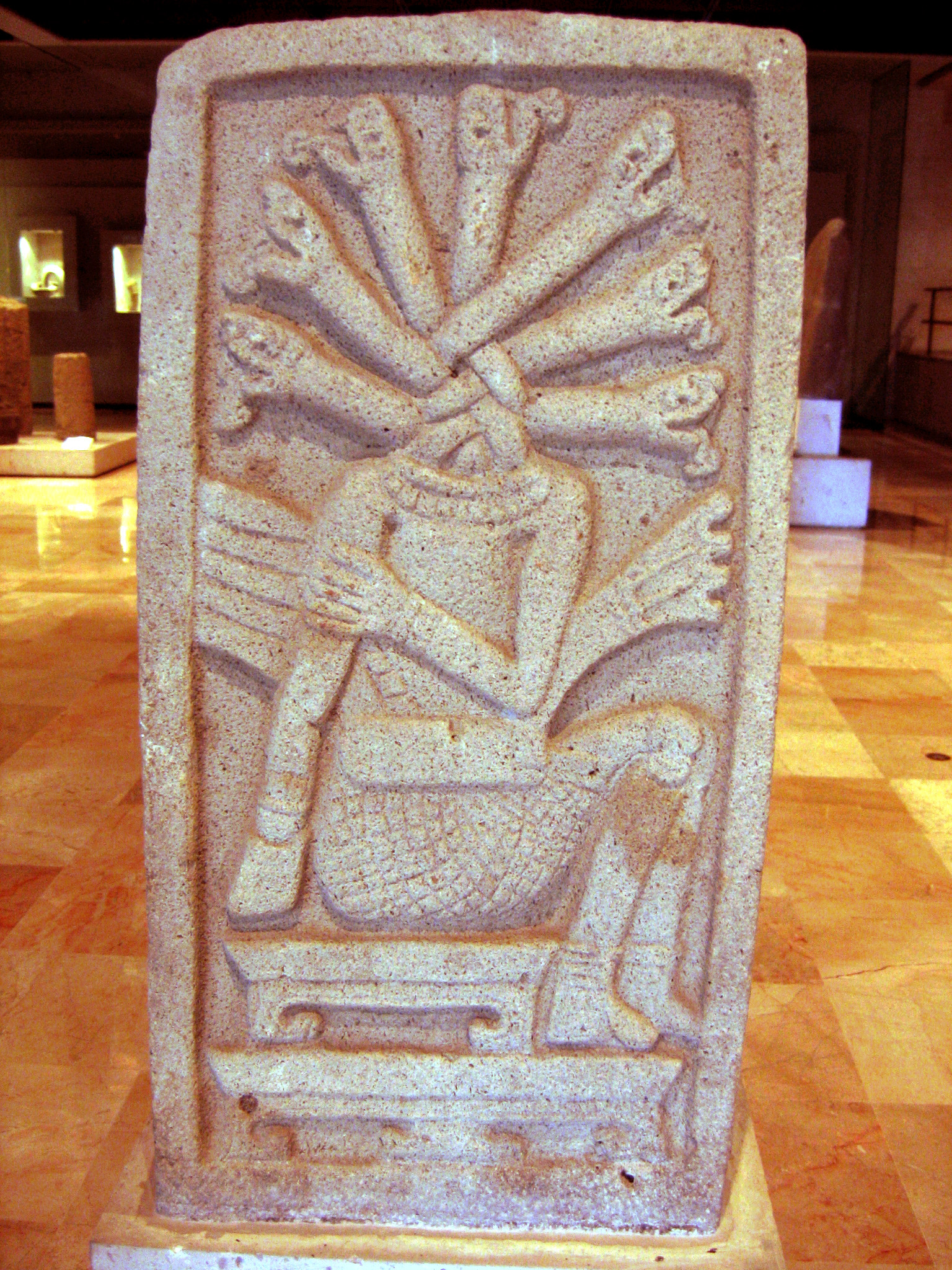
Decapitated ball player

Michael Harner, in his 1977 article The Enigma of Aztec Sacrifice, cites an estimate by Woodrow Borah, according to which about one percent of the population was sacrificed annually in the early 15th century. Borah calculated that about 250,000 persons were sacrificed every year, assuming a total population of the Aztec Empire of roughly 25 million. Others have rejected this estimate as implausibly high, arguing chiefly that the actual population was likely lower, implying that the victim count must have been lower too. Borah's method of calculating the number of sacrificed as a percentage of the population was also criticized as inappropriate. Fernando de Alva Cortés Ixtlilxóchitl, a Mexica descendant and the author of Codex Ixtlilxochitl, states that one in five children of the Mexica tributaries was killed annually, without translating this into an absolute number. He likely referred to sacrifices occurring throughout all of Central Mexico and might have meant that 20% of the children of subject people were sacrificed before growing up.

Robert William Martin provides a figure of 250 to 300 sacrifices per year in Tenochtitlan based on Durán's writings. On the basis of the Florentine Codex, Caroline Dodds Pennock estimates that about 500 people may have been sacrificed per tōnalpōhualli cycle in the Aztec capital. She leaves the possibility that such sacrifices were held in each calpulli district of the capital, resulting in a total number of victims about twenty times as high. For the total empire, she regards 1,000 to 20,000 annual victims as a plausible range. Susan Kellogg writes that the archaeological evidence and Nahuatl-language documentation do not support estimates of 20,000 or more annual victims.

Martin points out that "none of the chroniclers had an accurate way of measuring the number of victims slain" and that their numbers are "guesses, often made decades after the fact and with little physical evidence to support them". Some scholars believe that, since the Aztecs often tried to intimidate their enemies, they could deliberately have inflated the number of their own victims as a propaganda tool. Leonardo López Luján writes that, although there was a "heightened degree of ritual violence" in Mesoamerican societies of this era, "typical of many ancient Old and New World expansionist states", the exaggeration of sacrifice numbers by the Spanish was a means of justifying Spanish invasion and colonization; similarly, Indigenous writers also likely exaggerated the numbers to "exalt the might of their ancestors".

According to the Florentine Codex, fifty years before the conquest the Aztecs burnt the skulls of the former tzompantli. Archeologist Eduardo Matos Moctezuma has unearthed and studied some tzompantlis. In 2003, archaeologist Elizabeth Graham noted that the largest number of skulls yet found at a single tzompantli was only about a dozen. In 2015, Raùl Barrera Rodríguez, archeologist and director of the Urban Archaeology Program at National Institute of Anthropology and History (INAH), discovered a skull rack and skull towers next to the Templo Mayor complex that could have held thousands of skulls. As of 2020, 603 skulls have been identified as belonging to another tzompantli, which is thought to be one of the seven towers in Tenochtitlan formed from the skulls of sacrificial victims. Martin writes that, though some of the remains were probably lost, "that so few have been discovered strongly indicates that Spanish accounts were heavily exaggerated and that the Mexica sacrificed hundreds, not tens of thousands, of victims".

Every Aztec warrior would have to provide at least one prisoner for sacrifice. All the male population was trained to be warriors, but only the few who succeeded in providing captives could become full-time members of the warrior elite. Accounts also state that several young warriors could unite to capture a single prisoner, which suggests that capturing prisoners for sacrifice was challenging. On the other hand, Martin has disputed the importance of captive taking to Aztec military strategy. As he estimates the number of sacrificial victims to have been fairly small, he argues that the taking of large numbers of captives would not have been necessary.

There is still much debate as to what social groups constituted the usual victims of these sacrifices. It is often assumed that all victims were 'disposable' commoners or foreigners. However, slaves – a major source of victims – were not a permanent class but rather persons from any level of Aztec society who had fallen into debt or committed some crime. Likewise, most of the earliest accounts talk of prisoners of war of diverse social status, and concur that virtually all child sacrifices were locals of noble lineage, offered by their own parents. That women and children were not excluded from potential victims is attested by a tzompantli found in 2015 at Templo Mayor in the Aztec capital Tenochtitlan.

It is doubtful if many victims came from far afield. In 1454, the Aztec government forbade the slaying of captives from distant lands at the capital's temples. Duran's informants told him that sacrifices were consequently "nearly always ... friends of the [Royal] House", meaning warriors from allied states.

== Sacrifices to specific gods ==
=== Huitzilopochtli ===
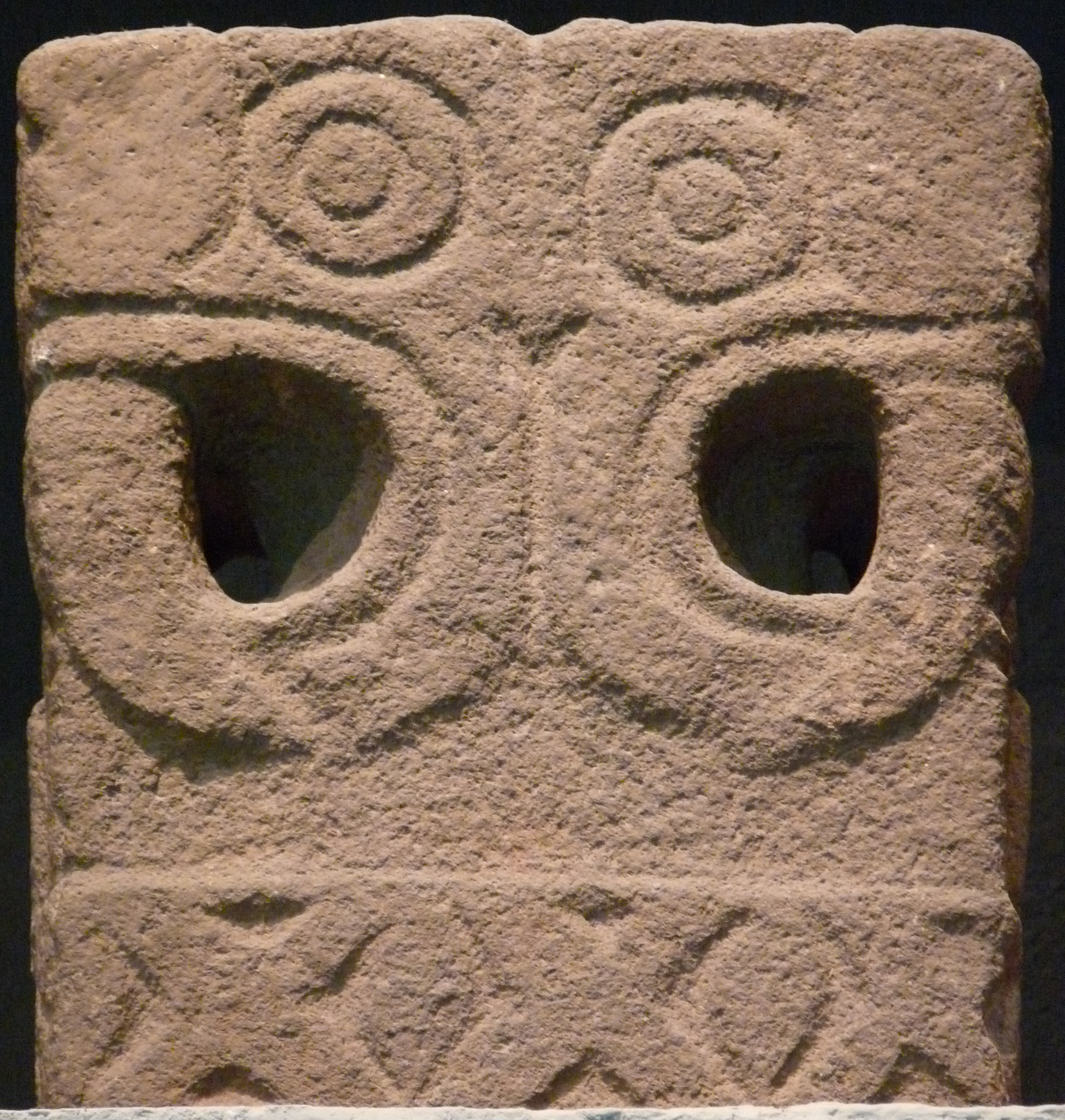
Techcatl — Mesoamerican sacrifice altar. Mexica room of the National Museum of Anthropology (Mexico City).

Huitzilopochtli was the tribal deity of the Mexica and as such, he represented the character of the Mexica people and was often identified with the sun at the zenith, and with warfare, who burned down towns and carried a fire-breathing serpent, Xiuhcoatl. He was considered the primary god of the south and a manifestation of the sun, and a counterpart of the black Tezcatlipoca, the primary god of the north, "a domain associated with Mictlan, the underworld of the dead".

Huitzilopochtli was worshipped at the Templo Mayor, which was the primary religious structure of the Aztec capital of Tenochtitlan. The Templo Mayor consisted of twin pyramids, one for Huitzilopochtli and one for the rain god Tlaloc (discussed below).

When the Aztecs sacrificed people to Huitzilopochtli (the god with warlike aspects) the victim would be placed on a sacrificial stone. The priest would then cut through the abdomen with an obsidian or flint blade. The heart would be torn out still beating and held towards the sky in honor to the Sun-God. The body would then be pushed down the pyramid where the Coyolxauhqui stone could be found. The Coyolxauhqui Stone recreates the story of Coyolxauhqui, Huitzilopochtli's sister who was dismembered at the base of a mountain, just as the sacrificial victims were. The body would be carried away and either cremated or given to the warrior responsible for the capture of the victim. He would either cut the body in pieces and send them to important people as an offering, or use the pieces for ritual cannibalism. The warrior would thus ascend one step in the hierarchy of the Aztec social classes, a system that rewarded successful warriors.

During the festival of Panquetzaliztli, of which Huitzilopochtli was the patron, sacrificial victims were adorned in the manner of Huitzilopochtli's costume and blue body paint, before their hearts would be sacrificially removed. Representations of Huitzilopochtli called teixiptla were also worshipped, the most significant being the one at the Templo Mayor which was made of dough mixed with sacrificial blood.

=== Tezcatlipoca ===
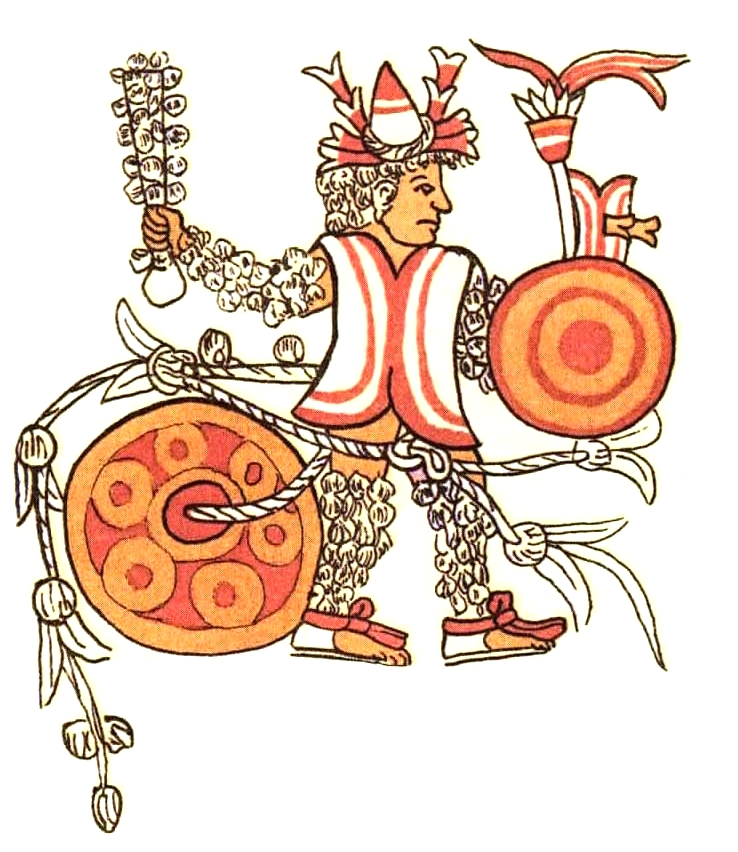
Victim of sacrificial gladiatorial combat, from Codex Magliabechiano. Note that he is tied to a large stone and his macuahuitl (sword/club) is covered with what appears to be feathers instead of obsidian.

Tezcatlipoca was generally considered the most powerful god, the god of night, sorcery and destiny (the name tezcatlipoca means "smoking mirror", or "obsidian"), and the god of the north. The Aztecs believed that Tezcatlipoca created war to provide food and drink to the gods. Tezcatlipoca was known by several epithets including "the Enemy" and "the Enemy of Both Sides", which stress his affinity for discord. He was also deemed the enemy of Quetzalcoatl, but an ally of Huitzilopochtli. Tezcatlipoca had the power to forgive sins and to relieve disease, or to release a man from the fate assigned to him by his date of birth; however, nothing in Tezcatlipoca's nature compelled him to do so. He was capricious and often brought about reversals of fortune, such as bringing drought and famine. He turned himself into Mixcoatl, the god of the hunt, to make fire. To the Aztecs, he was an all-knowing, all-seeing nearly all-powerful god. One of his names can be translated as "He Whose Slaves We Are".

Some captives were sacrificed to Tezcatlipoca in ritual gladiatorial combat. The victim was tethered in place and given a mock weapon. He died fighting against up to four fully armed jaguar knights and eagle warriors.

During the 20-day month of Toxcatl, a young impersonator of Tezcatlipoca would be sacrificed. Throughout a year, this youth would be dressed as Tezcatlipoca and treated as a living incarnation of the god. The youth would represent Tezcatlipoca on earth; he would get four beautiful women as his companions until he was killed. In the meantime he walked through the streets of Tenochtitlan playing a flute. On the day of the sacrifice, a feast would be held in Tezcatlipoca's honor. The young man would climb the pyramid, break his flute and surrender his body to the priests. Sahagún compared it to the Christian Easter.

=== Huehueteotl/Xiuhtecuhtli ===
Xiuhtecuhtli is the god of fire and heat and in many cases is considered to be an aspect of Huehueteotl, the "Old God" and another fire deity.

Xiuhtecuhtli was worshipped during the New Fire Ceremony, which occurred every 52 years, and prevented the ending of the world. During the festival, priests would march to the top of the volcano Huixachtlan, and when the constellation "the fire drill" (Orion's belt) rose over the mountain, a man would be sacrificed. The victim's heart would be ripped from his body and a ceremonial hearth would be lit in the hole in his chest. This flame would then be used to light all of the ceremonial fires in various temples throughout the city of Tenochtitlan.

=== Tlaloc ===
Tlaloc is the god of rain, water, and earthly fertility. The Aztecs believed that if sacrifices were not supplied for Tlaloc, rain would not come, their crops would not flourish, and leprosy and rheumatism, diseases caused by Tlaloc, would infest the village.

Archaeologists have found the remains of at least 42 children sacrificed to Tlaloc at the Great Pyramid of Tenochtitlan. Many of the children suffered from serious injuries before their death, they would have to have been in significant pain as Tlaloc required the tears of the young as part of the sacrifice. The priests made the children cry during their way to immolation: a good omen that Tlaloc would wet the earth in the raining season.

In the Florentine Codex, also known as General History of the Things of New Spain, Sahagún wrote:

According to the accounts of some, they assembled the children whom they slew in the first month, buying them from their mothers. And they went on killing them in all the feasts which followed, until the rains really began. And thus they slew some on the first month, named Quauitleua; and some in the second, named Tlacaxipeualiztli; and some in the third, named Tocoztontli; and others in the fourth, named Ueitocoztli; so that until the rains began in abundance, in all the feasts they sacrificed children.

=== Xipe Totec ===
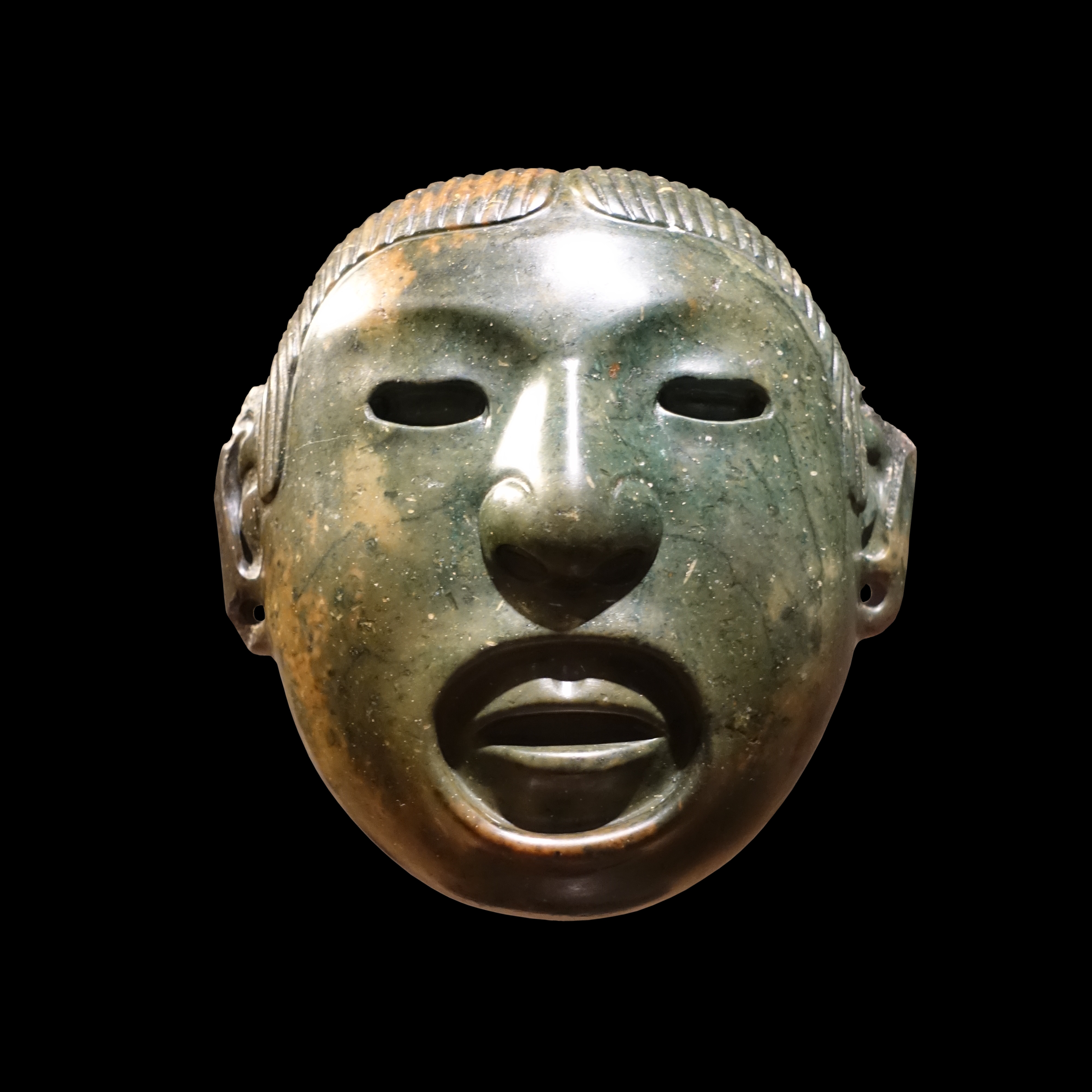
Xipe Totec mask

Xipe Totec, known as "Our Lord the Flayed One", is the god of rebirth, agriculture, the seasons, and craftsmen.

Xipe Totec was worshipped extensively during the festival of Tlacaxipehualiztli, in which captured warriors and slaves were sacrificed in the ceremonial center of the city of Tenochtitlan. For forty days prior to their sacrifice one victim would be chosen from each ward of the city to act as teixiptla, dress and live as Xipe Totec. The victims were then taken to the Xipe Totec's temple where their hearts would be removed, their bodies dismembered, and their body parts divided up to be later eaten. Prior to death and dismemberment the victim's skin would be removed and worn by individuals who traveled throughout the city fighting battles and collecting gifts from the citizens.

== Calendar of sacrifice ==
=== 52-year cycle ===
The cycle of 52 years was central to Mesoamerican cultures. The Nahua's religious beliefs were based on a great fear that the universe would collapse after each cycle if the gods were not strong enough. Every 52 years a special New Fire ceremony was performed. All fires were extinguished and at midnight a human sacrifice was made. The Aztecs then waited for the sunrise. If the Sun appeared it meant that the sacrifices for this cycle had been enough. A fire was ignited on the body of a victim, and this new fire was taken to every house, city, and town. Rejoicing was general: a new cycle of 52 years was beginning and the end of the world had been postponed, at least for another 52-year cycle.

Sacrifices were made on specific days. Sahagún, Juan Bautista de Pomar and Motolinía report that the Aztecs had 18 festivities each year, one for each Aztec month. The table below shows the festivals of the 18-month year of the Aztec calendar and the deities with which the festivals were associated.

No.	Name of the Mexican month and its Gregorian equivalent	Deities and human sacrifices	
I	Atlacacauallo (from February 2 to February 21)	Tláloc, Chalchitlicue, Ehécatl	Sacrifice of children and captives to the water deities
II	Tlacaxipehualiztli (from February 22 to March 13)	Xipe Tótec, Huitzilopochtli, Tequitzin-Mayáhuel	Sacrifice of captives; gladiatorial fighters; dances of the priest wearing the skin of the flayed victims
III	Tozoztontli (from March 14 to April 2)	Coatlicue, Tlaloc, Chalchitlicue, Tona	Type of sacrifice: extraction of the heart; burying of the flayed human skins; sacrifices of children
IV	Hueytozoztli (from April 3 to April 22)	Cintéotl, Chicomecacóatl, Tlaloc, Quetzalcoatl	Sacrifice of a maid; of boy and girl
V	Toxcatl (from April 23 to May 12)	Tezcatlipoca, Huitzilopochtli, Tlacahuepan, Cuexcotzin	Sacrifice of captives by extraction of the heart
VI	Etzalcualiztli (from May 13 to June 1)	Tláloc, Quetzalcoatl	Sacrifice by drowning and extraction of the heart
VII	Tecuilhuitontli (from June 2 to June 21)	Huixtocihuatl, Xochipilli	Sacrifice by extraction of the heart
VIII	Hueytecuihutli (from June 22 to July 11)	Xilonen, Quilaztli-Cihacóatl, Ehécatl, Chicomelcóatl	Sacrifice by decapitation of a woman and extraction of her heart
IX	Tlaxochimaco (from July 12 to July 31)	Huitzilopochtli, Tezcatlipoca, Mictlantecuhtli	Sacrifice by starvation in a cave or temple
X	Xocotlhuetzin (from August 1 to August 20)	Xiuhtecuhtli, Ixcozauhqui, Otontecuhtli, Chiconquiáhitl, Cuahtlaxayauh, Coyolintáhuatl, Chalmecacíhuatl	Sacrifices to the fire gods by burning the victims
XI	Ochpaniztli (from August 21 to September 9)	Toci, Teteoinan, Chimelcóatl-Chalchiuhcíhuatl, Atlatonin, Atlauhaco, Chiconquiáuitl, Cintéotl	Sacrifice of a decapitated young woman to Toci; she was skinned and a young man wore her skin; sacrifice of captives by hurling from a height and extraction of the heart
XII	Teoleco (from September 10 to September 29)	Xochiquétzal	Sacrifices by fire; extraction of the heart
XIII	Tepeihuitl (from September 30 to October 19)	Tláloc-Napatecuhtli, Matlalcueye, Xochitécatl, Mayáhuel, Milnáhuatl, Napatecuhtli, Chicomecóatl, Xochiquétzal	Sacrifices of children, two noble women, extraction of the heart and flaying; ritual cannibalism
XIV	Quecholli (from October 20 to November 8)	Mixcóatl-Tlamatzincatl, Coatlicue, Izquitécatl, Yoztlamiyáhual, Huitznahuas	Sacrifice by bludgeoning, decapitation and extraction of the heart
XV	Panquetzaliztli (from November 9 to November 28)	Huitzilopochtli	Massive sacrifices of captives and slaves by extraction of the heart
XVI	Atemoztli (from November 29 to December 18)	Tlaloques	Sacrifices of children and slaves by decapitation
XVII	Tititl (from December 19 to January 7)	Tona-Cozcamiauh, Ilamatecuhtli, Yacatecuhtli, Huitzilncuátec	Sacrifice of a woman by extraction of the heart and decapitation afterwards
XVIII	Izcalli (from January 8 to January 27)	Ixozauhqui-Xiuhtecuhtli, Cihuatontli, Nancotlaceuhqui	Sacrifices of victims representing Xiuhtecuhtli and their women (each four years), and captives; hour: night; New Fire
	Nemontemi (from January 28 to February 1)	Five ominous days at the end of the year, no ritual, general fasting	

== Primary sources ==
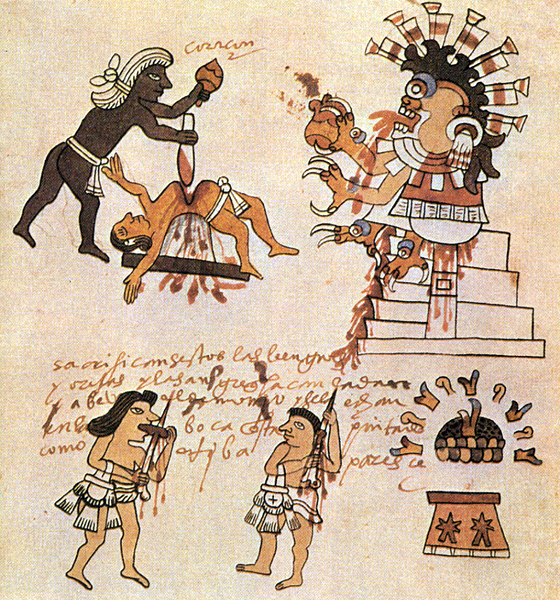
Codex Tudela

Visual accounts of Aztec sacrificial practice are principally found in codices and some Aztec statuary. Many visual renderings were created for Spanish patrons, and thus may reflect European preoccupations and prejudices. Produced during the 16th century, the most prominent codices include the Ríos, Tudela, Telleriano-Remensis, Magliabechiano, and Sahagún's Florentine. A contrast is offered in the few Aztec statues that depict sacrificial victims, which show an Aztec understanding of sacrifice. Rather than showing a preoccupation with debt repayment, they emphasize the mythological narratives that resulted in human sacrifices, and often underscore the political legitimacy of the Aztec state. For instance, the Coyolxauhqui stone found at the foot of the Templo Mayor commemorates the mythic slaying of Huitzilopochli's sister for the matricide of Coatlicue; it also, as Cecelia Kline has pointed out, "served to warn potential enemies of their certain fate should they try to obstruct the state's military ambitions".

In addition to the accounts provided by Sahagún and Durán, there are other important texts to be considered. Juan de Grijalva, Hernán Cortés, Juan Díaz, Bernal Díaz, Andrés de Tapia, Francisco de Aguilar, Ruy González and the Anonymous Conqueror detailed their eyewitness accounts of human sacrifice in their writings about the Conquest of the Aztec Empire. However, as the conquerors often used such accounts to portray the Aztecs in a negative light, and thus justifying their colonization, the accuracy of these sources has been called into question. Martyr d'Anghiera, Lopez de Gomara, Oviedo y Valdes and Illescas, while not in Mesoamerica, wrote their accounts based on interviews with the participants. Bartolomé de las Casas and Sahagún arrived later to New Spain but had access to direct testimony, especially of the indigenous people.

=== Juan de Grijalva and Juan Díaz ===
Juan de Grijalva was one of the first Spaniards to explore Mexico and traveled on his expedition in 1518 with Juan Díaz. Diaz wrote Itinerario de Grijalva before 1520, in which he describes the aftermath of a sacrifice on an island off the coast of Veracruz. He said,

When he reached said tower the Captain asked him why such deeds were committed there and the Indian answered that it was done as a kind of sacrifice and gave to understand that the victims were beheaded on the wide stone; that the blood was poured into the vase and that the heart was taken out of the breast and burnt and offered to the said idol. The fleshy parts of the arms and legs were cut off and eaten. This was done to the enemies with whom they were at war.

=== Bernal Díaz ===
Bernal Díaz corroborates Juan Díaz's history:

On these altars were idols with evil looking bodies, and that every night five Indians had been sacrificed before them; their chests had been cut open, and their arms and thighs had been cut off. The walls were covered with blood. We stood greatly amazed and gave the island the name isleta de Sacrificios [Islet of Sacrifices].

In The Conquest of New Spain Díaz recounted that, after landing on the coast, they came across a temple dedicated to Tezcatlipoca. "That day they had sacrificed two boys, cutting open their chests and offering their blood and hearts to that accursed idol". Díaz narrates several more sacrificial descriptions on the later Cortés expedition. Arriving at Cholula, they find "cages of stout wooden bars ... full of men and boys who were being fattened for the sacrifice at which their flesh would be eaten". When the conquistadors reached Tenochtitlan, Díaz described the sacrifices at the Great Pyramid:

They strike open the wretched Indian's chest with flint knives and hastily tear out the palpitating heart which, with the blood, they present to the idols ... They cut off the arms, thighs and head, eating the arms and thighs at ceremonial banquets. The head they hang up on a beam, and the body is ... given to the beasts of prey.

According to Bernal Díaz, the chiefs of the surrounding towns, for example Cempoala, would complain on numerous occasions to Cortés about the perennial need to supply the Aztecs with victims for human sacrifice. It is clear from his description of their fear and resentment toward the Mexicas that, in their opinion, it was no honor to surrender their kinsmen to be sacrificed by them.

At the town of Cingapacigna, Cortez told the chiefs that for them to become friends and brothers of the Spaniards they must end the practice of making sacrifices. According to Bernal Díaz:

Every day we saw sacrificed before us three, four or five Indians whose hearts were offered to the idols and their blood plastered on the walls, and their feet, arms and legs of the victims were cut off and eaten, just as in our country we eat beef bought from the butchers. I even believe that they sell it by retain in the tianguez as they call their markets.

On meeting a group of inhabitants from Cempoala who gave Cortés and his men food and invited them to their village:

Cortes thanked them and made much of them, and we continued our march and slept in another small town, where also many sacrifices had been made, but as many readers will be tired of hearing of the great number of Indian men and women whom we found sacrificed in all the towns and roads we passed, I shall go on with my story without saying any more about them.

=== Hernán Cortés and the Anonymous Conquistador ===
Cortés was the Spanish conquistador whose expedition to Mexico in 1519 led to the fall of the Aztecs, and led to the conquering of vast sections of Mexico on behalf of the Crown of Castile.

Cortés wrote of Aztec sacrifice on numerous occasions, one of which in his Letters, he states:

They have a most horrid and abominable custom which truly ought to be punished and which until now we have seen in no other part, and this is that, whenever they wish to ask something of the idols, in order that their plea may find more acceptance, they take many girls and boys and even adults, and in the presence of these idols they open their chests while they are still alive and take out their hearts and entrails and burn them before the idols, offering the smoke as sacrifice. Some of us have seen this, and they say it is the most terrible and frightful thing they have ever witnessed.

The Anonymous Conquistador was an unknown travel companion of Cortés who wrote Narrative of Some Things of New Spain and of the Great City of Temestitan which details Aztec sacrifices. The Anonymous Conquistador wrote,

They lead him to the temple, where they dance and carry on joyously, and the man about to be sacrificed dances and carries on like the rest. At length the man who offers the sacrifice strips him naked, and leads him at once to the stairway of the tower where is the stone idol. Here they stretch him on his back, tying the hands to the sides and fastening the legs ... Soon comes the sacrificing priest—and this is no small office among them—armed with a stone knife, which cuts like steel, and is as big as one of our large knives. He plunges the knife into the breast, opens it, and tears out the heart hot and palpitating. And this as quickly as one might cross himself. At this point the chief priest of the temple takes it, and anoints the mouth of the principal idol with the blood; then filling his hand with it he flings it towards the sun, or towards some star, if it be night. Then he anoints the mouths of all the other idols of wood and stone, and sprinkles blood on the cornice of the chapel of the principal idol. Afterwards they burn the heart, preserving the ashes as a great relic, and likewise they burn the body of the sacrifice, but these ashes are kept apart from those of the heart in a different vase.

== Archaeological evidence of human sacrifice ==
Modern excavations in Mexico City have found evidence of human sacrifice in the form of hundreds of skulls at the site of old temples.

Other human remains found in the Great Temple of Tenochtitlan contribute to the evidence of human sacrifice through osteologic information. Indentations in the rib cage of a set of remains reveal the act of accessing the heart through the abdominal cavity, which correctly follows images from the codices in the pictorial representation of sacrifice.

Over 1800 (MNI) human remains have been written about in the dual capital of Tenochtitlan-Tlatelolco alone including a few burials of over 100 human remains, and remains have also been found at other sites including Zultepec and Tenayuca, but much of the archaeological data has not been published so the numbers are likely far higher.

== Proposed explanations ==
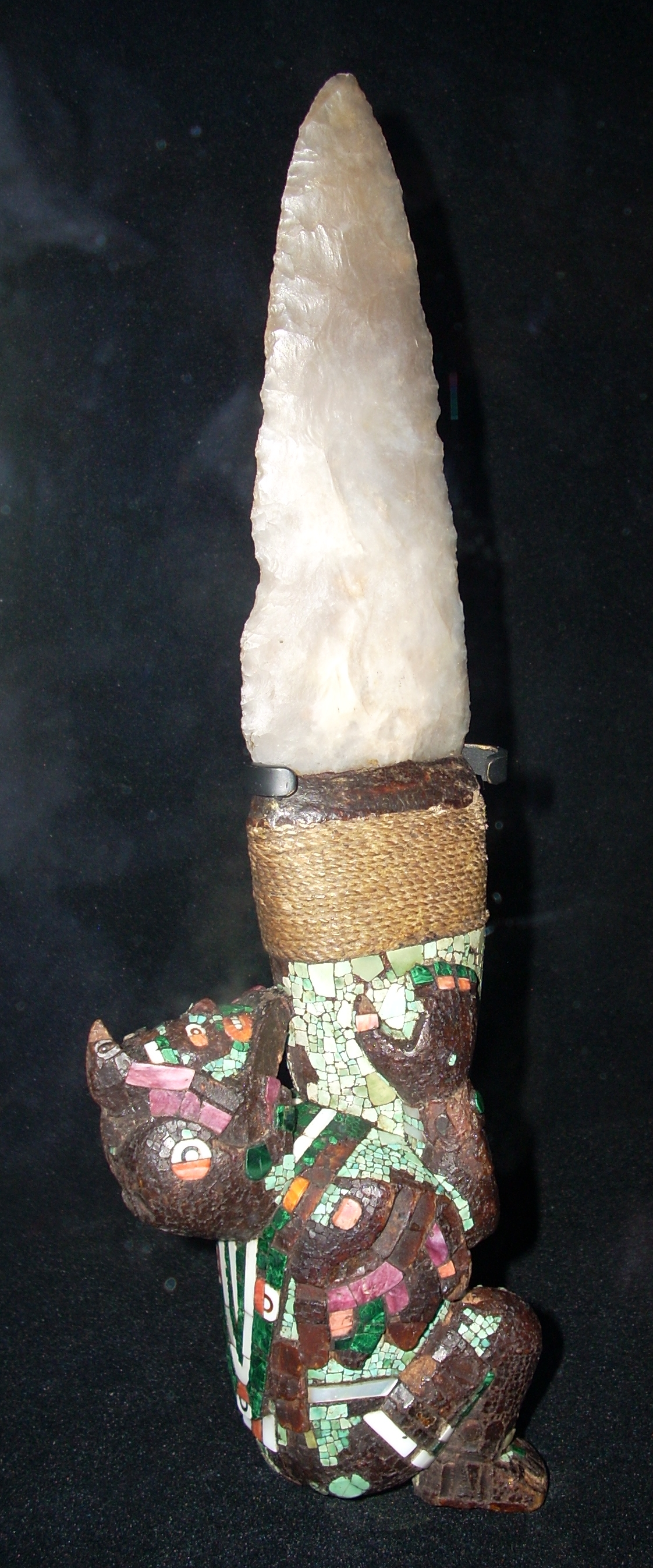
Aztec or Mixtec sacrificial knife, probably for ceremonial use only, in the British Museum

=== Ecological and economic explanations ===
While some authors doubt that the Aztecs practiced cannibalism at all, a larger debate has focused on possible reasons and explanations, with especially Michael Harner and Marvin Harris favoring an ecological explanation of human sacrifice. They postulate that the flesh of the victims played a significant role in the diet of Aztec elites. Harner argues that the Aztec diet was deficient in essential amino acids due to a large population and an emphasis on maize agriculture without domesticated herbivores. As population increased and the amount of available game decreased, the Aztecs had to compete with other carnivorous mammals, such as dogs, to find food. Harner believes that although intensified agricultural practices provided the Aztec society a surplus of carbohydrates, they did not provide sufficient nutritional balance; for this reason, the cannibalistic consumption of sacrificed humans helped to supply an appropriate amount of protein per individual. Harris, author of Cannibals and Kings, supports this view, arguing that the flesh of the victims served as a reward in the aristocratic diet, due to animal protein otherwise being scarce.

Bernard Ortiz Montellano rejects several elements of this explanation. He challenges Harner's claim of the Aztecs needing to compete with other carnivorous mammals for protein-packed food, arguing that many other types of foods were available to them, including meat from salamanders, fowls, armadillos, and weasels. In addition, the nutrients found in the leaves and seeds of amaranth also provided protein, reducing the need for meat. Lastly, he argues that the Aztecs had a highly structured system in which chinampas and tribute provided a surplus of materials and ensured the Aztec met their nutritional needs. Ortiz also rejects Harner's estimates of the number of victims as way too high, suggesting that Spanish propaganda led to implausible, vastly inflated numbers.

Other authors are likewise skeptical of a purely or chiefly ecological explanation. Michael Winkelman argues that, while ecological factors may have played a role, human sacrifice was also motivated by religious beliefs that cannot be fully explained as due to practical necessities.

The core questions regarding the role of human sacrifice in Aztec political and economic life have also been approached in 20th-century discourse by the philosopher Georges Bataille, who inverts earlier historians' and anthropologists' emphasis on searching for a clear practical, pragmatic function of human sacrifice within Aztec society, instead focusing on sacrifice as a form of pure ritualistic consumption with no tangible productive end. Bataille places human sacrifice in such cases firmly within the realm of "sacred excess" rather than within activities describable in classical economic terms, incorporating historical accounts of Aztec human sacrifice into his larger economic theories laid out in The Accursed Share.

Bataille draws a distinction between "general economy" and "restricted economy", arguing that contemporary models of "restricted economy" have long failed to consider forms of unproductive expenditure such as sacrifice in its various manifestations across cultures to be legitimate economic activity, working upon the premise that human life is based on a natural state of excess rather than scarcity. To Bataille, Aztec religious practices embody a form of sacrificial expenditure explainable only under a model of extravagant consumption as a means of a society eliminating its economic excess, as well as by viewing the prevalence of such activity across cultures, particularly primitive societies, to be an extension of processes of nature eliminating excess within the biosphere.

=== Religious explanations ===
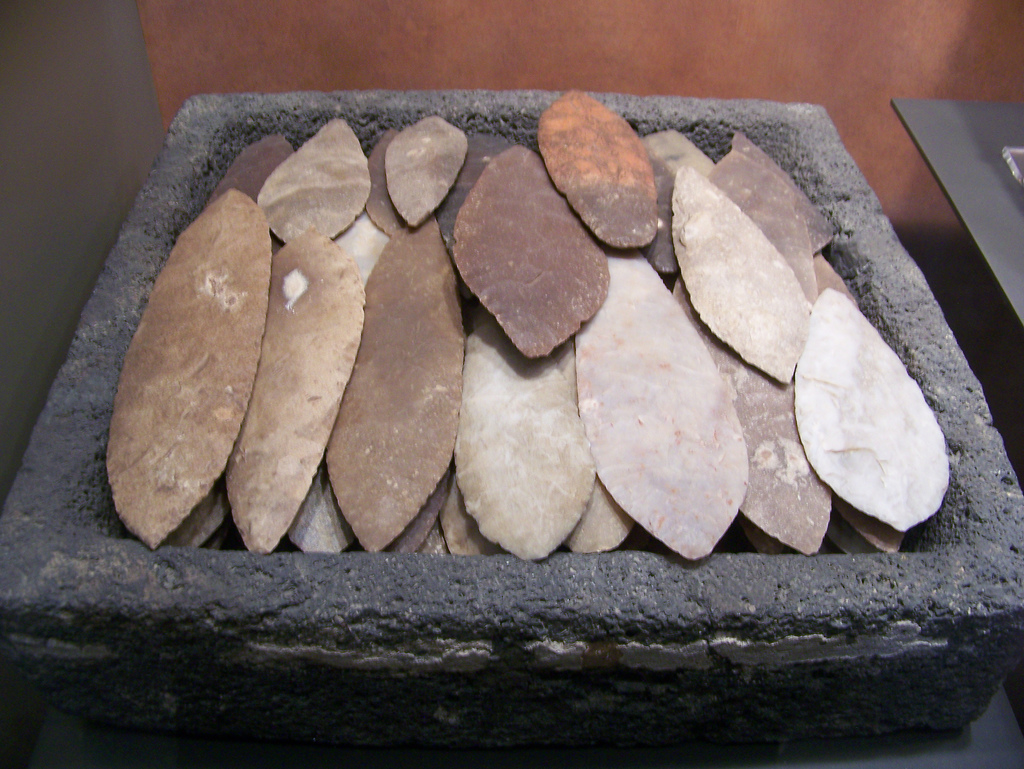
A ceremonial offering of Aztec sacrificial knife blades tecpatlixquahua [tekpat͡ɬiʃˈkʷawa] at the National Museum of Anthropology in Mexico City

Sacrifices were ritualistic and symbolic acts accompanying huge feasts and festivals, and were a way to properly honor the gods. Victims usually died in the "center stage" amid the splendor of dancing troupes, percussion orchestras, elaborate costumes and decorations, carpets of flowers, crowds of thousands of commoners, and all the assembled elite. Aztec texts frequently refer to human sacrifice as neteotoquiliztli, "the desire to be regarded as a god". These members of the society became an teixiptla—that is, a god's representative, image or idol.

For each festival, at least one of the victims took on the paraphernalia, habits, and attributes of the god or goddess whom they were dying to honor or appease. Through this performance, it was said that the divinity had been given 'human form'—that the god now had an ixitli (face). Duran says such victims were 'worshipped ... as the deity' or 'as though they had been gods'. Even whilst still alive, teixiptla victims were honored, hallowed and addressed very highly. Particularly the young man who was indoctrinated for a year to submit himself to Tezcatlipoca's temple was the Aztec equivalent of a celebrity, being greatly revered and adored to the point of people "kissing the ground" when he passed by.

Posthumously, their remains were treated as actual relics of the gods which explains why victims' skulls, bones and skin were often painted, bleached, stored and displayed, or else used as ritual masks and oracles. For example, Diego Duran's informants told him that whoever wore the skin of the victim who had portrayed god Xipe (Our Lord the Flayed One) felt he was wearing a holy relic. He considered himself 'divine'.

=== Political explanations ===
Politically, human sacrifice was important in Aztec culture as a way to represent a social hierarchy between their own culture and the enemies surrounding their city. Additionally, it was a way to structure the society of the Aztec culture itself. The hierarchy of cities like Tenochtitlan were tiered with the Tlatoani (emperor) on the top, the remaining nobles (pipiltin) next who managed the land owned by the emperor. Then the warriors, the pochteca (merchants), commoners and farmers. Then the lowest level of the hierarchy consisted of slaves and indentured servants. The only way of achieving social mobility was through successful performance as a warrior. This shows how important capturing enemies for sacrifice was as it was the singular way of achieving some type of "nobility".

Within the system of organization based on hierarchy, there was also a social expectation contributing to the status of an individual at the time of their sacrifice. An individual was punished if unable to confidently address their own sacrifice, i.e. the person acted cowardly beforehand instead of brave. Then, instead of being sacrificed honorably, their lowly death paralleled their new lowly status. Where one's body traveled in the afterlife also depended on the type of death awarded to the individual. Those who died while being sacrificed or while battling in war went to the second-highest heaven, while those who died of illness were the lowest in the hierarchy. Those going through the lowest hierarchy of death were required to undergo numerous torturous trials and journeys, only to culminate in a somber underworld. Additionally, death during Flower Wars was considered much more noble than death during regular military endeavors.

== See also ==
- Aztec religion
- Human sacrifice in Maya culture
- Human trophy taking in Mesoamerica

== Bibliography ==
- Anonymous Conqueror (1917) [ca.1550]. Marshall H. Saville; Alec Christensen (eds.). Narrative of Some Things of New Spain and of the Great City of Temestitan, México. Translated by Marshall H. Saville. New York: The Cortes Society. OCLC 6720413 – via FAMSI.
- Carrasco, David (1999). City of Sacrifice: The Aztec Empire and the Role of Violence in Civilization. Boston, MA: Beacon Press. ISBN 978-0-8070-4642-5. OCLC 41368255.
- Díaz del Castillo, Bernal (1963) [1632]. The Conquest of New Spain. Penguin Classics. Translated by J. M. Cohen (6th printing ed.). Harmondsworth, England: Penguin Books. ISBN 978-0-14-044123-9. OCLC 162351797.
- Durán, Diego (1994) [ca.1581]. Doris Heyden (ed.). The History of the Indies of New Spain. Civilization of the American Indian series, #210. Translated by Doris Heyden. Norman: University of Oklahoma Press. ISBN 978-0-8061-2649-4. OCLC 29565779.
- Godwin, Robert W. (2004). One Cosmos under God: The Unification of Matter, Life, Mind & Spirit. Saint Paul, MN: Paragon House. ISBN 978-1-55778-836-8. OCLC 55131504.
- Hassig, Ross (1988). Aztec Warfare: Imperial Expansion and Political Control. Civilization of the American Indian series, no. 188. Norman: University of Oklahoma Press. ISBN 978-0-8061-2121-5. OCLC 17106411.

Ingham, John M. "Human Sacrifice at Tenochtitln." Society for Comparative Studies in Society and History 26 (1984): 379–400.

- León-Portilla, Miguel (1963). Aztec Thought and Culture: A Study of the Ancient Náhuatl Mind. Civilization of the American Indian series, #67. Translated by Jack Emory Davis. Norman: University of Oklahoma Press. OCLC 181727.
- Matos Moctezuma, Eduardo (1998). Vida y muerte en el Templo Mayor (in Spanish) (3rd ed.). México D.F.: Fondo de Cultura Económica. ISBN 978-968-16-5712-3. OCLC 40997904.
- Ortiz De Montellano, Bernard R. (June 1983). "Counting Skulls: Comment on the Aztec Cannibalism Theory of Harner-Harris". American Anthropologist. 85 (2): 403–406. doi:10.1525/aa.1983.85.2.02a00130. OCLC 1479294. S2CID 162218640.
- Ortiz De Montellano, Bernard R. (1990). Aztec Medicine, Health, and Nutrition. New Brunswick, NJ: Rutgers University Press. ISBN 978-0-8135-1562-5. OCLC 20798977.
- Sahagún, Bernardino de (1950–82) [ca. 1540–85]. Charles E. Dibble; Arthur J.O. Anderson (eds.). Florentine Codex: General History of the Things of New Spain, 13 vols. in 12. vols. I-XII. Santa Fe, NM and Salt Lake City: School of American Research and the University of Utah Press. ISBN 978-0-87480-082-1. OCLC 276351.
- Schele, Linda; Mary Ellen Miller (1992). Blood of Kings: Dynasty and Ritual in Maya Art. Justin Kerr (photographer) (2nd paperback, reprint with corrections ed.). New York: George Braziller. ISBN 978-0-8076-1278-1. OCLC 41441466.
