= Sacrifice in Maya culture =

Religious activity involving killings of humans and animals

Sacrifice was a religious activity in Maya culture, involving the killing of humans or animals, or bloodletting by members of the community, in rituals superintended by priests. Sacrifice has been a feature of almost all pre-modern societies at some stage of their development and for broadly the same reason: to propitiate or fulfill a perceived obligation towards the gods.

== Crisis and sacrifice ==
What is known of Mayan ritual practices comes from two sources: the extant chronicles and codices of the missionary-ethnographers who arrived with or shortly after the Spanish conquest of Yucatán, and subsequent archaeological data. The historical record is more sparse than that for the Aztecs, and can only be reliable in regards to the Post-Classical period, long after the Classic Maya collapse. The chroniclers have also been accused of colonial bias, but the most comprehensive account of Maya society, by Diego de Landa, has been described by modern experts as an "ethnographic masterpiece”, despite his role in the destruction of Maya codices.

The archaeological data has continued to expand as more excavations are undertaken, confirming much of what the early chroniclers wrote. A major breakthrough was the deciphering of the Maya syllabary in the 1950s, which has allowed the glyphs carved into many temples to be understood. Excavation and forensic examination of human remains have also thrown light on the age, sex, and cause of death of sacrificial victims.

== Sacrifices in calendar and everyday rituals ==
=== Human sacrifice ===
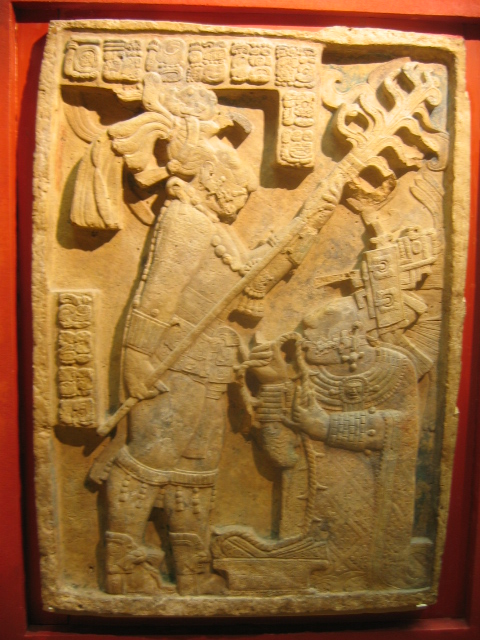
Lintel 24 at Yaxchilan, depicting Lady Xoc drawing a barbed rope through her tongue.

The Mayans engaged in a large number of festivals and rituals on fixed days of the year, many of which involved animal sacrifices and all of which seem to have involved bloodletting. The ubiquity of this practice is a unique aspect of pre-Columbian Mesoamerican culture, and is now believed to have originated with the Olmecs, the region's first civilization.

Ritualised sacrifice was usually performed in public by religious or political leaders piercing a soft body part, most commonly the tongue, ear or foreskin, and collecting the blood to smear directly on the idol or collecting it on paper, which was then burned. In what is today Nicaragua, the blood was smeared on corn, distributed to the people and baked into sacred bread. The blood could also be collected from the non-elite, often from the foreskins of youths, or from high-ranking women.

The site of the collection was of obvious ritual significance. Joralemon notes it is "virtually certain" that blood from the penis and the vagina was the most sacred and had "extraordinary fertilizing power" and that such rituals were essential for the regeneration of the natural world, particularly cultivated plants. In one dramatic variant men and women gathered in the temple in a line, and each made a pierced hole through the member, across from side to side, and then passed through as great a quantity of cord as they could stand; and thus all together fastened and strung together, they anointed the statue the Spanish considered to be sun worship of "Baʿal" from the Bible. But auto-sacrifice could also be an everyday event, with those passing by an idol anointing it with blood drawn on the spot as a sign of piety.

Blood sacrifice to the Maya gods was vigorously opposed by the Spanish clergy as the most visible sign of native apostasy, as De Landa, who was later to become the second bishop of the Yucatán, makes clear:

"After the people had been thus instructed in religion, and the youths benefitted as we have said, they were perverted by their priests and chiefs to return to their idolatry; this they did, making sacrifices not only by incense but also of human blood. Upon this the friars held an Inquisition, calling upon the Alcalde Mayor for aid; they held trials and celebrated an Auto, putting many on scaffolds, capped, shorn, and beaten, and some in the penitential robes for a time. Some of the Indians out of grief, and deluded by the devil, hung themselves; but generally, they all showed much repentance and readiness to be good Christians."

De Landa provides the most comprehensive account of calendar festivals and rituals (chapters 34-40), but in none of these regular events is human sacrifice mentioned, which must mean his Maya informants were unaware of any instances since the cleric would hardly have suppressed such information.

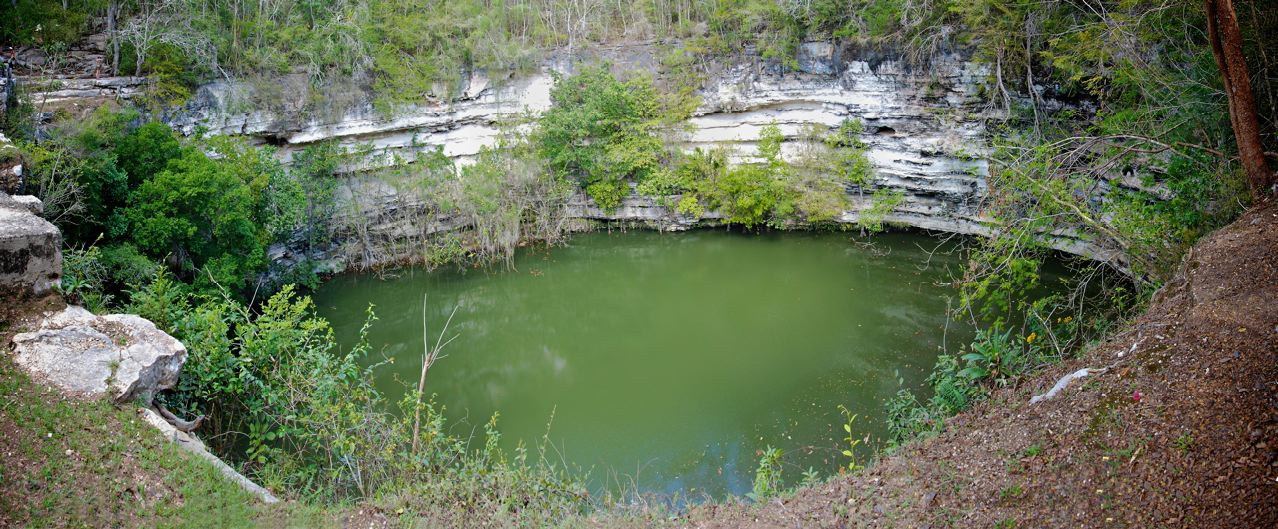
Sacred Cenote: the site of an unknown number of human sacrifices

The traditional view is that the Mayans were far less prolific in sacrificing people than their neighbours. Bancroft notes: "An event which in Mexico would be the death-signal to a hecatomb of human victims would in Yucatán be celebrated by the death of a spotted dog."(p. 704) But mounting archeological evidence has for many decades now supported the chroniclers' contention that human sacrifice was far from unknown in Maya society. The city of Chichen Itza, the main focus of Maya regional power from the Late Classical period, appears to have also been a major focus of human sacrifice. There are two natural sinkholes, or cenotes, at the site of the city, which would have provided a plentiful supply of potable water. The largest of these, Cenote Sagrado (also known as the Well of Sacrifice), was where many victims were cast as an offering to the rain god Chaac. A 2007 study of remains taken from this cenote found that they had wounds consistent with human sacrifice.

Bancroft describes one procedure:

A long cord was then fastened round the body of each victim, and the moment the smoke ceased to rise from the altar, all were hurled into the gulf. The crowd, which had gathered from every part of the country to see the sacrifice, immediately drew back from the brink of the pit and continued to pray without cessation for some time. The bodies were then drawn up and buried in the neighboring grove. (p.705)

There is no consensus on why these sacrifices took place, their true scale at different times, or even who the victims were.

Because Maya society was organised as independent city-states, the local political and religious elites could independently initiate human sacrifices as they saw fit. De Landa notes that a common cause for temple sacrifices in many cities was the occurrence of "pestilences, dissensions, or droughts or the like ills". (p. 91) In such cases, slaves were usually purchased and after a variety of rituals were anointed with blue dye and either shot with arrows through the heart or held on an altar while the priest swiftly removed the heart using a ceremonial knife. In either case the heart was presented to the temple idol, which was also anointed with blood. According to Bancroft, one tribe sacrificed illegitimate boys twice a year, again by removing the heart, but collecting the blood in a bowl and scattering it to the four cardinal compass points within the temple.

Capturing prisoners after a successful battle also provided victims for sacrifice, presumably to propitiate whatever deity had promised victory in the first place, although there is no record of the Maya initiating conflicts solely for this purpose as was apparently the case with the Aztecs. Modern analysis of the ancient Maya art indicates a large number of representations of prisoners of war that are now understood to be sacrificial victims: "The analysis of the representations and sometimes of their context shows that the crossed-arms-on-the-chest gesture is associated with the concepts of submissiveness, captivity and death — in a word, sacrifice."

==== Child sacrifice ====
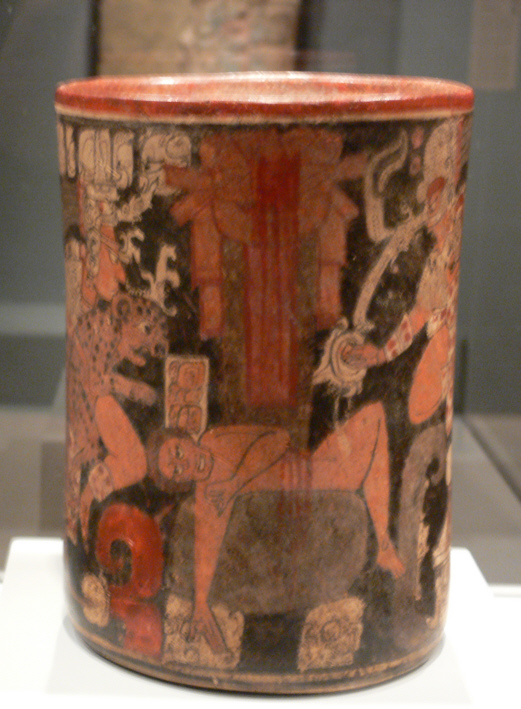
Human sacrificial victim on an altar flanked by two dancing grandees, Classic Maya vessel, 600–850 AD (Dallas Museum of Art)

Mayanists believe that, like the Aztecs, the Maya performed child sacrifice in specific circumstances, most commonly as foundation dedications for temples and other structures. Maya art from the Classic period also depicts the extraction of children's hearts during the ascension to the throne of the new king, or at the beginnings of the Maya calendar. In one of these cases, Stele 11 in Piedras Negras, Guatemala, a sacrificed boy can be seen. Other scenes of sacrificed boys are visible on jars.

As archeologists continue to excavate, more instances of child dedicatory sacrifices are being uncovered. A dig commenced in 1974 at the northern Belize site of Lamanai turned up the remains of five children, ranging in age from a newborn to about 8 years old:

"The conclusion that the five children were sacrificial victims is virtually inescapable... Nowhere else at Lamanai is there evidence of human sacrifice, either of children or adults... However, it is clear that the offering of children as part of the dedicatory activities that preceded the setting up of stelae was not uncommon at any time or place in the Maya lowlands."

In 2005 a mass grave of one- to two-year-old sacrificed children was found in the Maya region of Comalcalco. The sacrifices were apparently performed for dedicatory purposes when building temples at the Comalcalco acropolis.

An excavation at El Perú-Wakaʼ turned up the remains of an infant with, unusually, those of an adult male, in the presence of extensive evidence of feasting that had followed the expansion of a residence which had then been "ensouled" by the rituals and sacrifices. The analysis suggests that the "interments show that human sacrifice was not limited to the royal actors associated with the Classic Maya state, but could be practiced by lesser elites as part of their own private ceremonies."

=== Animal sacrifice ===
White-tailed deer were perhaps the most popular sacrificial animal, heavily featured in Maya art. After deer, the next most common sacrificial animals were dogs and various birds (whose heads were offered to the idols), followed by a wide range of other creatures, from jaguars to alligators. In the highlands, however, Sharpe (2022) notes that dogs, rather than deer, were the most prevalent animals in ceremonial activities and sacrifices at sites.

Animal sacrifice also seems to have been a common ritual before the commencement of any important task or undertaking.

==== Examples ====
The Maya often raised animals for the purposes of sacrificing and eating them at ritual feasts. Spanish colonizers reported that the Maya would kill and consume massive quantities of turkey in an annual ritual sacrifice and feast.

The Dresden Codex, an 11th-12th century illustrated Maya book, depicts birds being used in ritual sacrifice, deer tied up near sacrificial sites, and pieces of deer meat placed into ritualistic containers. Both the Madrid Codex and the Borgia Codex depict a deer ritual in which deer are tied to trees and killed with spears.

At Laguna de On Island, remains of tapir, peccary, deer, crocodile, iguana, and agouti were all found concentrated around a spot believed to have been used for ritual butchering. These animals were found in much smaller proportions or are completely absent in the surrounding areas, indicating elite control over animals used for butchering. Another structure on the island was found to contain evidence of both ritual practice and deer jaw bones.

In a Maya burial chamber in Xunatunich, an upper-class adult male was found buried with both deer and jaguar bones scattered over his body. At Xunatunich and Baking Pot, deer bones and turtle shells were found without the cut marks associated with consumption, pointing towards their use in ritual sacrifice. Postclassical records describe both deer and turtles being sacrificed at these sites.

A gravesite discovered at Yaxuná featured the scattered bones of jaguars, rabbits, deer, opossum, birds, lizards, and snakes on and around the body.

==== Archaeological controversy & misconceptions ====
In many cases, animals used for sacrifices were also consumed, making the line between animals used for ritual & sacrificial practices and animals relied on for food unclear or absent. Montero-Lopez argues that on the basis of analysis of the distribution of deer parts in Classical Maya sites that the archeological record does not support a clear distinction between the secular and sacred uses of animals. This issue comes further to light when studying the lower classes. Because rituals in Maya society were conducted exclusively by elites, poorer people would get almost all of the meat in their diets from these ritual feasts. Despite this convergence, it remains common in the literature to consider food use of animals and ritual use of animals separately.

Mesoamerica lacked conventional domesticated food animals such as sheep, cows, and pigs, and some researchers have taken this to mean animal protein and byproducts could only be obtained by hunting. In reality, evidence points to the Maya having domesticated deer and dogs on a large scale. There is a well-documented practice of Maya households fattening up dogs on maize, either to eat themselves or to ritually offer to elites.

In Seibal, possible remains of animal pens were found with pieces of antler, indicating that deer were kept close at hand for consumption and ritual use. In Cozumel, stone enclosures from the Postclassic period were found to contain droppings from animals and domesticated turkey bones. These turkeys must have been imported from Northern Mexico, as they were not native to Cozumel. In the highlands, Kaminaljuyu was a major ceremonial center, with Pacific marine fish and Central Mexican hairless dogs recovered from mounds, as well as elite and non-elite burials, highlighting trade connections and ritual practices.

== Origins, meaning, and social function ==
Both blood and human sacrifice were ubiquitous in all cultures of pre-Columbian Mesoamerica, but beyond some uncontroversial generalisations there is no scholarly consensus on the broader questions (and specific mysteries) this raises. Most scholars agree that both practices arose among the Olmecs at least 3,000 plus years ago, and have been transmitted to subsequent cultures, including the Maya. Why they arose among the Olmecs is unknown, and probably unknowable, given the paucity of data.

Blood, and by extension the still-beating heart, is the central element in both the ethnography and iconography of sacrifice, and its use through ritual established or renewed for the Maya a connection with the sacred that was for them essential to the very existence of the natural order. Julian Lee's observation that the Maya "drew no sharp distinction between the animate and the inanimate" and the remarks by Pendergast and others that sacrifices "ensouled" buildings and idols indicate a social meaning, as Reilly suggests, most akin to transubstantiation – a literal rather than symbolic transformation on which the fate of the world and its inhabitants depended.

As with all known theocratic societies, it is likely the Maya political and religious elites played mutually reinforcing roles in supporting the position of the other and ensuring the social stability essential for both, with sacrifice rituals functioning as the performative centrepiece of communal integration. But on likely divergences of interests between different social groups in regard to sacrifice rituals, including within these elites, the historical record has so far been silent.

== See also ==
- Maya religion
- Human trophy taking in Mesoamerica
- Kukulkan
- Maya peoples
