= Human sacrifice in Maya culture =

Ritual offering of human flesh and lives to gods and goddesses

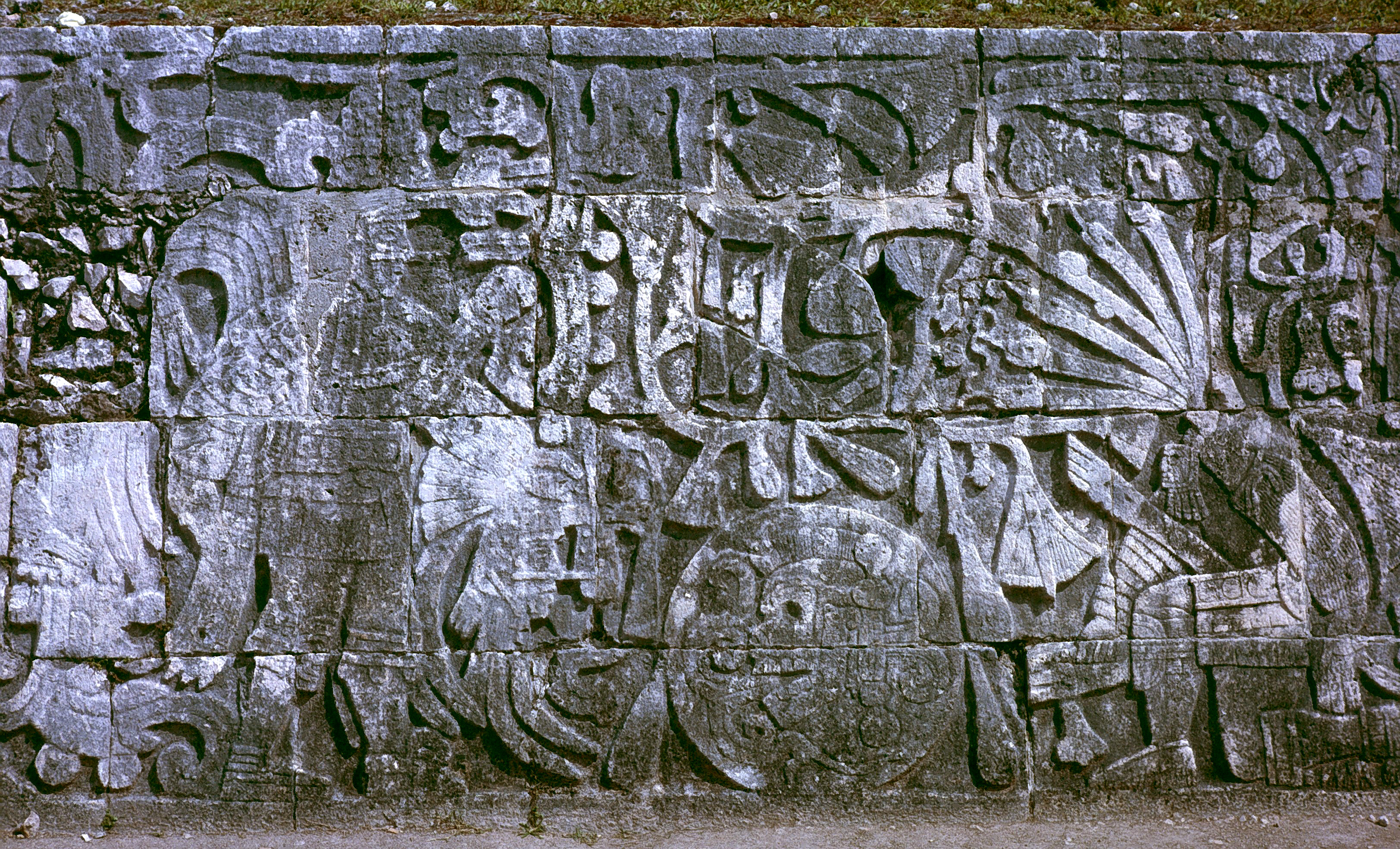
Sculpture in the Great Ballcourt at Chichen Itza depicting sacrifice by decapitation. The figure at left holds the severed head of the figure at right, who spouts blood in the form of serpents from his neck

During the pre-Columbian era, human sacrifice in Maya culture was the ritual offering of nourishment to the gods. Blood was viewed as a potent source of nourishment for the Maya deities, and the sacrifice of a living creature was a powerful blood offering. By extension, human sacrifice was the ultimate offering of blood to the gods and the culmination of the most important Maya rituals. Generally, only high-status prisoners of war were sacrificed, and lower status captives were used for labor.

Human sacrifice among the Maya is evident from at least the Classic period (c. AD 250–900) right through to the final stages of the Spanish conquest in the 17th century. Human sacrifice is depicted in Classic Maya art, is mentioned in Classic period glyph texts and has been verified archaeologically by analysis of skeletal remains from the Classic and Postclassic (c. AD 900–1524) periods. Additionally, human sacrifice is described in a number of late Maya and early Spanish colonial texts, including the Madrid Codex, the Kʼicheʼ epic Popol Vuh, the Kʼicheʼ Título de Totonicapán, the Kʼicheʼ language Rabinal Achi, the Annals of the Kaqchikels, the Yucatec Songs of Dzitbalche and Diego de Landa's Relación de las cosas de Yucatán.

== Methods ==
=== Decapitation ===
Important rituals such as the dedication of major building projects or the enthronement of a new ruler required a human sacrificial offering. The sacrifice of an enemy king was the most prized offering, and such a sacrifice involved the decapitation of the captive ruler in a ritual reenactment of the decapitation of the Maya maize god by the Maya death gods. In AD 738, the vassal king Kʼakʼ Tiliw Chan Yopaat of Quiriguá captured his overlord, Uaxaclajuun Ubʼaah Kʼawiil of Copán and a few days later he ritually decapitated him; such royal sacrifices were often recorded in Maya script with the "ax event" glyph. The decapitation of an enemy king may have been performed as part of a ritual ballgame reenacting the victory of the Maya Hero Twins over the gods of the underworld.

Sacrifice by decapitation is depicted in Classic period Maya art, and sometimes took place after the victim was tortured, being variously beaten, scalped, burnt or disembowelled. Sacrifice by decapitation is depicted on reliefs at Chichen Itza in two of the ballcourts (the Great Ballcourt and the Monjas Ballcourt). The Hero Twins myth recounted in the Popol Vuh relates how one of each pair of twins (the Hero Twins themselves and their father and uncle) was decapitated by their ballgame opponents.

=== Heart removal ===
Heart extractions and sacrifice have been viewed as a "supreme religious expression among the ancient Maya". The removal of the still-beating heart, or sometimes self-immolation, was considered a great offering and meal for the gods. It began with a dispersal of blood extracted either from the mouth, nose, ears, fingers, or penis, typically with a sharp tool made from animal bone, such as a stingray spine. The victim would then be positioned on a stone or wooden altar, and access to the heart would be achieved with a variety of procedures and techniques. Most of these techniques were proved by examination of the post-mortem injuries on bones surrounding the heart, such as the sternum, and ribs. Methods include vertical axial sternotomy, left transverse thoracotomy, transverse bilateral sternothoracotamy, or transdiaphragmatic access. The preferred method was most probably from below the diaphragm, as this allowed for easy access and not much blockage from bones (nicks, segmenting, and fracturing of the sternum and ribs indicate this). After this, the heart was exposed to retrieval. If accessed through the sternum the ribs would be pulled apart, or if via the diaphragm tissue would be cut. The actual removal of the heart was achieved by cutting the attaching ligaments with a bifacial tool. Finally, offering of the heart would take place with either special positioning or through burning. At this time, blood would also be collected from the victim. The ritual will end with mutilation of the body, usually through dismemberment, or burned. They would then dispose of the body or reutilize it for other purposes.

During the Postclassic period (c. 900–1524), the most common form of human sacrifice was heart extraction, influenced by the method used by the Aztecs in the Valley of Mexico; this usually took place in the courtyard of a temple, or upon the summit of the pyramid-temple. The sacrifice was stripped and painted blue, which was the colour representing sacrifice, and was made to wear a peaked headdress.

Four blue-painted attendants representing the four Chaacs of the cardinal directions stretched the sacrifice out over a convex stone that pushed the victim's chest upwards. An official referred to as a nacom in Landa's Relación de las cosas de Yucatán used a sacrificial knife made from flint to cut into the ribs just below the victim's left breast and pull out the still-beating heart. The nacom then passed the heart to the officiating priest, or chilan, who smeared blood upon the image of the temple's deity.

Depending upon the exact ritual, sometimes the four Chaacs would throw the corpse down the pyramid steps to the courtyard below, where it would be skinned by assistant priests, except for the hands and feet. The chilan would then remove his ritual attire and dress in the skin of the sacrificial victim before performing a ritual dance that symbolised the rebirth of life. If it was a notably courageous warrior who had been sacrificed, then the corpse would be cut into portions and parts would be eaten by attending warriors and other bystanders. The hands and feet were given to the chilan who, if they had belonged to a war captive, wore the bones as a trophy. Archaeological investigations indicate that heart sacrifice was practised as early as the Classic period.

=== Arrow sacrifice ===
Some rituals involved the sacrifice being killed with bow and arrows. The sacrificial victim was stripped and painted blue and made to wear a peaked cap, in a similar manner to the preparation for heart sacrifice. The victim was bound to a stake during a ritual dance and blood was drawn from the genitals and smeared onto the image of the presiding deity. A white symbol was painted over the victim's heart, which served as a target for the archers. The dancers then passed in front of the sacrificial victim, shooting arrows in turn at the target until the whole chest was filled with arrows.

Sacrifice with bow and arrow is recorded as far back as the Classic Period (c. 250–900) and was depicted with graffiti upon the walls of Tikal Temple II. The Songs of Dzitbalche are a collection of Yucatec Maya poems written down in the mid-18th century; two poems deal with arrow sacrifice and they are believed to be copies of poems dating to the 15th century, during the Postclassic period. The first, called Little Arrow, is a song calling upon the sacrifice to be brave and take comfort. The second is entitled Dance of the Archer and is a ritual dedicated to the rising sun; it includes instructions to the archer; the archer is instructed upon how to prepare his arrows and to dance three times around the sacrifice. The archer is instructed not to shoot until the second circuit, and to be careful to make sure that the sacrifice dies slowly. On the third circuit, whilst still dancing, the archer is instructed to shoot twice. A similar scene is described in the Annals of the Kaqchikels, where an important prisoner is bound to a scaffold; the Kaqchikel warriors begin a ritual "blood dance" and proceed to shoot him full of arrows. In the Late Postclassic Kʼicheʼ language drama Rabinal Achi, an important war captive is tied to a stake representing the mythological Maize Tree and is sacrificed by being shot with arrows; the text compares the archers to hunters and the sacrifice to game.

=== Bloodletting ===
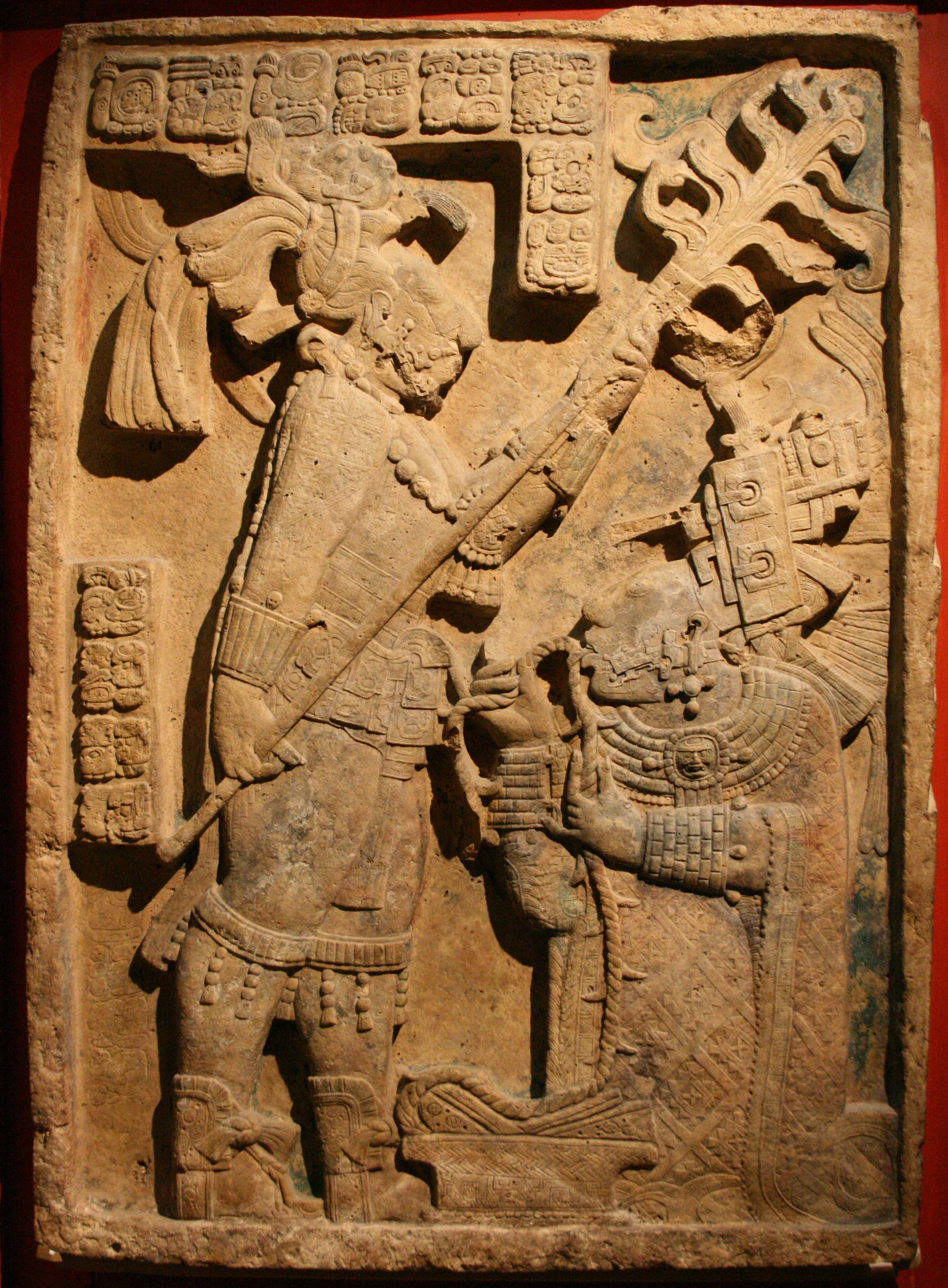
Lintel 24 from the city of Yaxchilan. The sculpture depicts a sacred blood-letting ritual which took place on October 28, 709. King Itzamnaaj B'alam II is shown holding a torch, while his wife Lady Xoc draws a barbed rope through her pierced tongue, British Museum.

Blood served a very important purpose in Maya culture. It was believed to contain a "life-force" or chu ‘lel that was required by supernatural forces. Blood was offered to the gods or deities by auto-sacrificial bloodletting. Practitioners would cut or pierce themselves with a variety of tools such as bone awls and needles, obsidian blades, or maguey thorns. Blood would be obtained from areas such as ears, cheeks, lips, nostrils, tongue, arms, legs, and the penis. Taking blood from areas such as the penis was symbolic of reproduction and fertility. Once bleeding, the blood would be caught on an item such as bark paper, cotton, animal feathers, and then burned as to deliver it to the gods.

=== Animal sacrifice ===
Animals were also frequently sacrificed. Animals such as quail, turkeys, deer, and dogs were commonly used. Quail were considered "clean and pure" to the Zapotec, because they drank water from dew drops, and not "dirty water" sources. Species used include the Montezuma quail (Cyrtonyx montezumae) and the bobwhite quail (Colinus virginianus). There is also evidence of jaguar sacrifice at Copán and Teotihuacan. Their remains have led researchers to believe they were used for funerary rites of great leaders or other occasions. They were seen as the "alter ego" to their powerful shaman kings.

=== Other methods ===
Late Classic graffiti from a structure buried under Group G in Tikal depicts a sacrifice bound to a stake with his hands tied behind his head; the victim was disembowelled. At the Classic period city of Palenque, a woman in her twenties was entombed alive to accompany a deceased nobleman as a funerary offering.

At the Sacred Cenote in Chichen Itza, people were hurled into the cenote during times of drought, famine or disease. The Sacred Cenote is a naturally occurring sinkhole eroded from the local limestone; it is approximately 50 metres (160 ft) wide and drops 20 metres (66 ft) to the water surface, with the water another 20 metres (66 ft) deep. The sides of the cenote are sheer. Human sacrifice was practiced right up until the Spanish conquest of Yucatán, well after the decline of the city.

At times sacrifices were tightly bound into a ball and were bounced in a ritual reenactment of the ballgame.

Some other sacrifice-related practices include burning victims alive, dancing in the skin of a skinned victim, taking head trophies, cannibalism, drinking a deceased relative's bathwater, and sprinkling sacrificial blood around sanctuaries.

== History ==
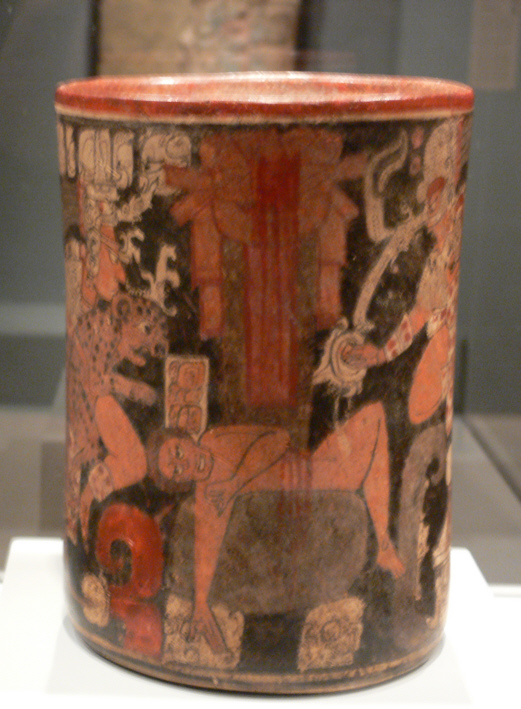
Classic period Maya vessel with a scene of human sacrifice

=== Classic period (250–900) ===
Human sacrifice is depicted in Late Classic artwork and sometimes involved torture; sacrifice was generally via decapitation. At times the sacrificial victim was dressed as a deer. The intended sacrifice may have been publicly displayed and paraded before the act of sacrifice itself. Images of human sacrifice were often sculpted into the steps of Maya architecture and such stairways may have been the site of periodic sacrifice. Ritual decapitation is well attested from Maya hieroglyphic texts throughout the Classic period. Evidence of mass sacrifice during the Classic period has not been recovered archaeologically. Archaeological excavations at a number of sites, including Palenque, Calakmul and Becan, have uncovered skeletons that bear marks to the vertebrae and ribs consistent with heart extraction at the time of death using a long-bladed flint knife. During the Classic period, the sacrifice of companions to accompany high-ranking burials is likely to have been widespread and performed using the heart extraction method, leaving little evidence on skeletal remains. Analysis of those remains that do bear marks suggestive of heart sacrifice indicates that during the Classic period the Maya used a method involving cutting across the diaphragm immediately below the ribcage and cutting the heart free.

During the Late Classic period (600–900), a feature of ritualistic practices that rose into prevalence were skull racks, or tzompantli. The skulls placed here were typically from sacrificial rituals and victims. Chichen Itza had one of the largest, most elaborate skull racks during the Late Classic period. It was four levels high, and featured representational skulls carved into stone. These skull racks were strongly associated with ballgames, and sacrificial decapitations.

=== Postclassic period (900–1524) ===
A Postclassic mass burial in Champotón in Campeche, Mexico, included skeletons bearing evidence of violent blows to the sternum that have been interpreted as evidence of heart sacrifice. The Madrid Codex, a Postclassic hieroglyphic Maya book, has an illustration of sacrifice by heart extraction, with the victim stretched over an arched stone.

Among the Kʼicheʼ of highland Guatemala, human sacrifice was performed to the Kʼicheʼ gods. Writing at the end of the 17th century, Francisco Ximénez described the tradition that upon the temple of Tohil, human sacrifices were tied before the representation of the deity, where the priest would open the victim's chest and cut out his heart. After sacrifice, the victim's body was probably hurled down the front stairway of the temple where his head would be severed to be placed on a skull rack that was located in front of the temple. In the Kʼicheʼ epic Popol Vuh, the god Tohil demands his right to suckle from his people, as an infant to its mother, but Tohil suckled upon human blood from the chest of the sacrificial victim. The Popol Vuh also describes how the Hero Twin Hunahpu was sacrificed with both the removal of his heart and his head. Human sacrifice was probably also performed to the Kʼicheʼ mountain god Jacawitz. Human sacrifice is also mentioned in the Kʼicheʼ document Título de Totonicapán ("Title of Totonicapán"). A long passage describing human sacrifice is difficult to interpret but features heart and arrow sacrifice, the flaying of the victim and wearing of his skin in a manner similar to the Aztec rituals associated with their god Xipe Totec, and mention of the sacrificial knife of Tohil.

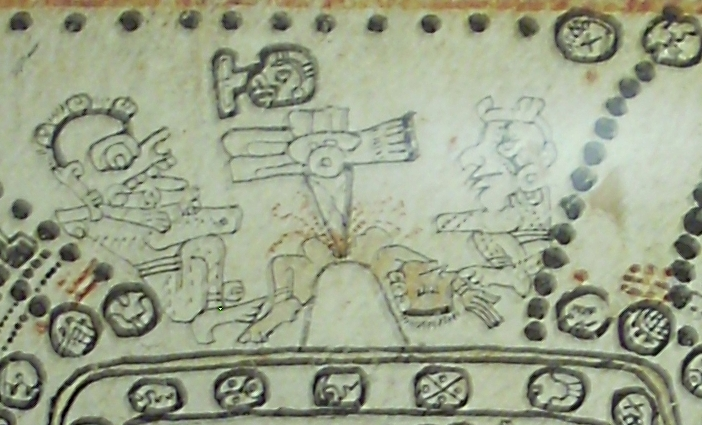
A section of page 76 of the Madrid Codex, depicting sacrifice by heart extraction

The Kaqchikel Maya, neighbours of the Kʼicheʼ, also practised human sacrifice. Ample evidence of human sacrifice has been excavated at Iximche, their capital. Human sacrifice is evidenced at the site by the altar upon Structure 2, of a type used in heart sacrifice, and by a cylindrical cache of skulls taken from decapitated victims accompanied by obsidian knives. A pentatonic flute crafted from a child's femur was recovered from one of the temples and is also indicative of human sacrifice. A sacrificial flint knife was also recovered from Structure 3, and a circular altar at the site is very similar to those used for so-called "gladiatorial sacrifice" by the Aztecs and it may have served this purpose. The Annals of the Kaqchikels record that around 1491 the rulers of Iximche captured the rulers of the Kʼicheʼ, as well as the image of Tohil. The captured king and his co-ruler were sacrificed together with the son and grandson of the king, other noblemen and high-ranking warriors. The same text describes how the Kaqchikel captured a powerful lord, called Tolkʼom, who was tied to a scaffold and was shot with arrows during a ritual dance.

=== Human sacrifice during the Spanish conquest (1511–1697) ===
In 1511 the Spanish caravel Santa María de la Barca set sail along the Central American coast to Santo Domingo from Darien under the command of Pedro de Valdivia. The ship was wrecked upon a reef somewhere off Jamaica. There were just twenty survivors from the wreck, including Captain Valdivia, Gerónimo de Aguilar and Gonzalo Guerrero. The survivors set themselves adrift in one of the ship's boats, with bad oars and no sail; after thirteen days during which half of the survivors died, they made landfall upon the coast of Yucatán. There they were seized by the Maya Lord Halach Uinik. (Note: Halach Uinik is actually a title rather than a personal name, meaning "real man" and referring to the ruler of a province. Clendinnen 2003, p. 25.) Captain Valdivia was sacrificed with four of his companions, and their flesh was served at a feast. The other prisoners were fattened for killing, although Aguilar and Guerrero managed to escape.

After the disastrous Spanish-led assault on Uspantán in 1529, captives taken by the Uspanteks were sacrificed to Exbalamquen, one of the Hero Twins. In 1555 the Acala and their Lacandon allies killed the Spanish friar Domingo de Vico. De Vico, who had established a small missionary church in San Marcos (in Alta Verapaz, Guatemala), had offended a local Maya ruler; the indigenous leader shot the friar through the throat with an arrow; the angry natives then sacrificed him by cutting open his chest and extracting his heart. His corpse was then decapitated; the natives carried off his head as a trophy, which was never recovered by the Spanish. In the early 1620s a Spanish party received permission to visit the still independent Itza capital at Nojpetén, headed by friar Diego Delgado who was accompanied by 13 Spanish soldiers and 80 Christianised Maya guides from Tipu, now in Belize. The party was seized when they arrived at Nojpetén and sacrificed with their hearts cut out. They were then decapitated and their heads displayed on stakes around the city; Delgado was dismembered. The main Spanish party was ambushed at Sakalum in January 1624 and slaughtered. The Spanish Captain Francisco de Mirones and a Franciscan priest were sacrificed using the heart extraction method after being bound to the forked posts of the church. The rest of the Spanish party were also sacrificed, and their bodies impaled on stakes at the village entrance.

In 1684 three Franciscan friars were killed, probably by heart sacrifice, at the Manche Chʼol settlement of Paliac on the Caribbean coast of Belize. They included Francisco Custodio, Marcos de Muros, and an unnamed lay brother.

A number of additional Spanish missionaries were sacrificed at Nojpetén. In February 1696 Franciscan friar Juan de San Buenaventura and an unspecified Franciscan companion were taken to Nojpetén during a skirmish between the Yucatec Spanish and the Itza on the west shore of Lake Petén Itzá. The Itza high priest AjKin Kan Ekʼ later related that he had the Franciscans bound in the form of crosses and then cut out their hearts. About a month later a Guatemalan Spanish expedition was ambushed and slaughtered; Dominican friars Cristóbal de Prada and Jacinto de Vargas were taken across to the island of Nojpetén and were similarly bound to X-shaped crosses before having their hearts cut out.

== Evidence ==
=== Codices ===
Much of the evidence of Maya sacrificial rituals is taken from images on their codices. A codex is an ancient manuscript made on sheets of paper, or paper-like materials. These records usually contain information pertinent to that era and people and detail many cultural and ritualistic aspects of life. Much of what is known from Maya culture is gathered from these books. Maya codices contain glyph like imagery that is related to deities, sacrifices, rituals, moon phases, planet movements, and calendars. Three codices that are considered legitimate are the Dresden, Madrid, and Paris Codices. These codices all feature depictions of human sacrificial rituals such as heart extractions and decapitations.

== In popular culture ==
The 2006 film Apocalypto depicts scenes of human sacrifice in Maya culture.

== See also ==
- Human trophy taking in Mesoamerica
- Human sacrifice in Aztec culture
