= Narrative of Some Things of New Spain and of the Great City of Temestitan =

The Narrative of Some Things of New Spain and of the Great City of Temestitan is one of the sources for the Spanish conquest of the Aztec Empire dating from the 16th century, one of the many surviving contemporary Spanish accounts from the period of the Spanish conquest of the Aztec Empire and central Mexico (1519–1521). However, unlike conqueror accounts which highlight individual deeds worthy of rewards from the Spanish crown (a genre called probanzas or relaciones de méritos y servicios), the Anonymous Conqueror's account is descriptive of indigenous life at the time of the conquest.

The author of the document is unknown, and is referred to as a Companion of Hernán Cortés (or simply "The Anonymous Conqueror" or "Gentleman of Cortés"). The account, firstly published in Italian in 1556 by Giovan Battista Ramuso as part of his work "Delle Navigationi et Viaggi", has been translated to English in Patricia de Fuente's 1993 University of Oklahoma Press publication, The Conquistadors: First-person Accounts of the Conquest of Mexico.

The Narrative provides descriptions of the life and culture of the pre-Columbian Aztec/Mexica and surrounding peoples of the Valley of Mexico, as they were first encountered by the expedition of Conquistadores under Hernán Cortés. This narrative describes everything from the land and animals, to military concerns, to food and drink, to religion and government, to architecture and beyond. Historians are divided as to whether the Narrative is a genuine narrative or merely based on reports from returning Conquistadors. It also contains information on the weapons of the Aztecs in comparison to those of the Spaniards.

== See also ==
- Spanish conquest of the Aztec Empire
- The Conquest of New Spain, by Bernal Díaz del Castillo
