= Human trophy taking in Mesoamerica =

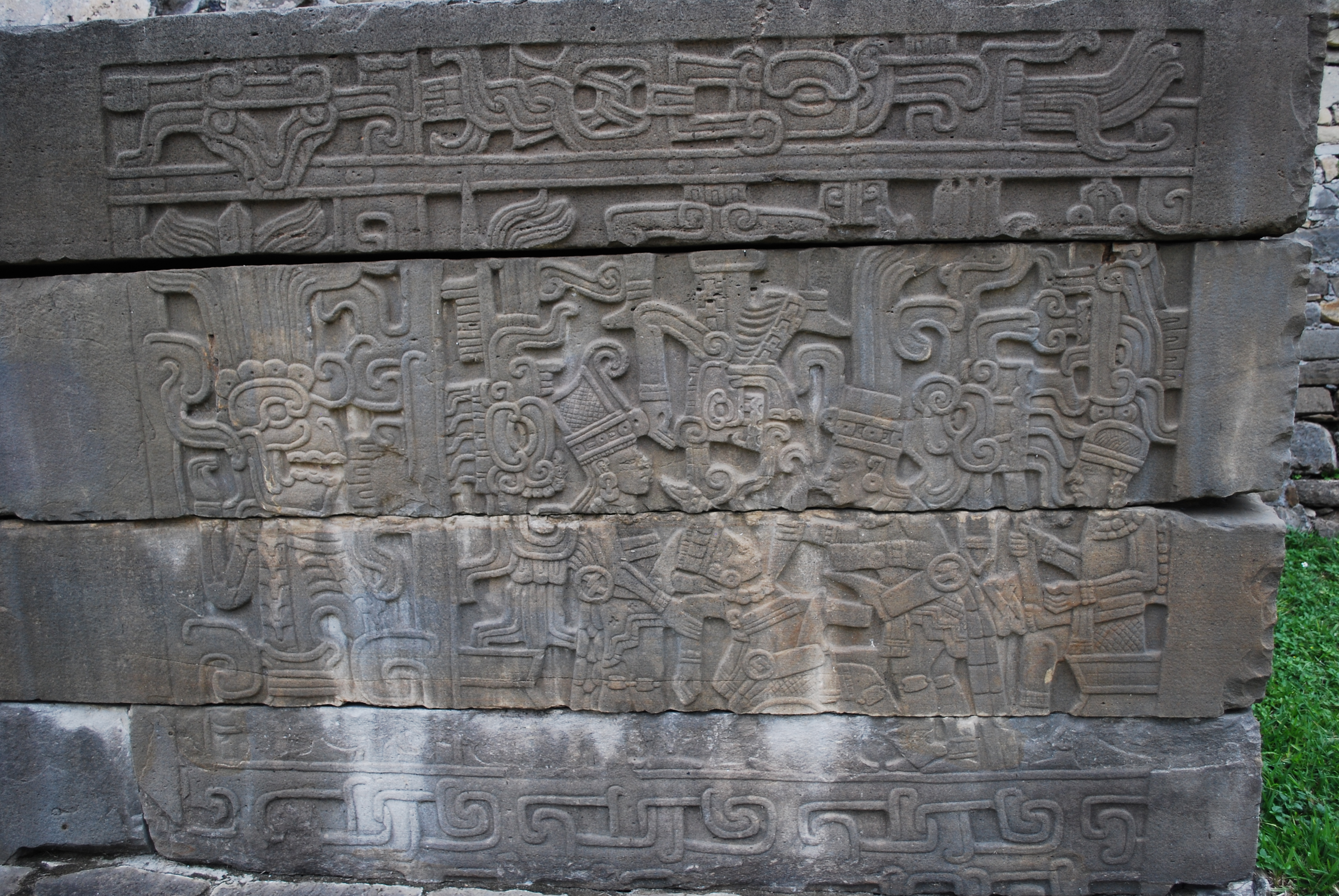
Human sacrifice shown on a panel at one of the ballcourts at El Tajín, Veracruz, in Mexico.

Most of the ancient civilizations of Mesoamerica such as the Olmec, Maya, Mixtec, Zapotec and Aztec cultures practiced some kind of taking of human trophies during warfare. Captives taken during war would often be taken to their captors' city-states where they would be ritually tortured and sacrificed. These practices are documented by a rich material of iconographic and archaeological evidence from across Mesoamerica.

== In ancient Maya culture ==
Evidence of the ritualistic sacrifice and taking human body parts as trophies in Maya civilization exists from as far back as the Middle Formative period (800 – 500 BC). The evidence consists of skeletal remains and depictions in Maya iconography, commonly showing acts of human sacrifice. Excavations at the non-Maya site of Teotihuacan have unearthed the remains of hundreds of bodies that are thought to represent a mass sacrifice at the Temple of the Feathered Serpent. At the Temple of the Moon, another excavation site, there were a number of decapitated remains found along with numerous bound bodies of headless males. Given these two examples of mass sacrificial sites, there is no reason why this could not have taken place in Maya society.

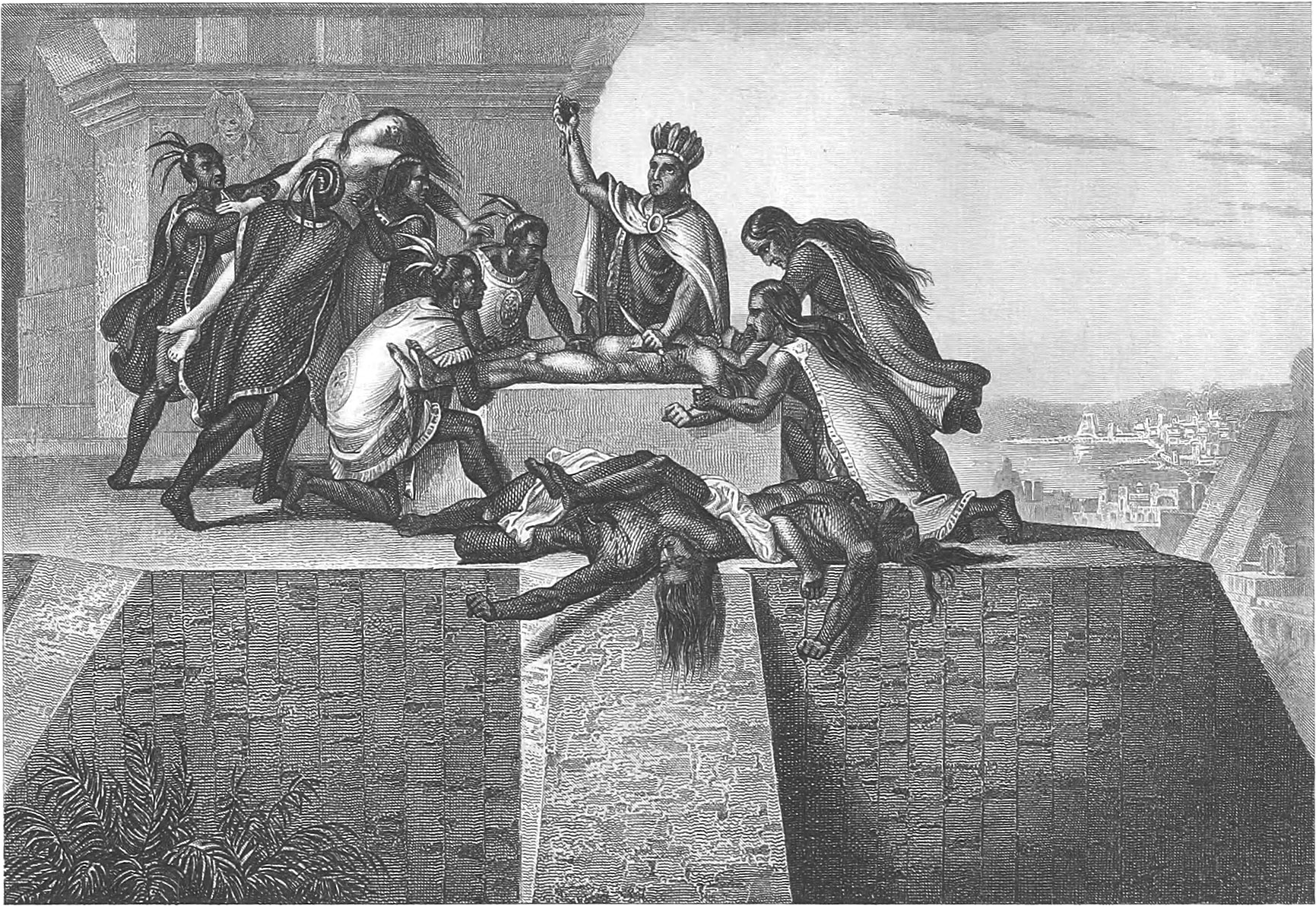
Human sacrifice by Johann Georg Heck.

With that in mind, there are other possible explanations that are commonly used among the Maya. It is not unreasonable to think that some of these sites are examples of ancestral veneration. This was a selective social practice in which ancestors were considered a subset of all the deceased and were the ones who validated political power, status and access to resources. There is also proof that the mortuary practices of the region were varied and once thought to be evidence of human sacrifice. They were commonly found in locations of tomb reuse and secondary burial practice.

It is believed for the most part, that the soldiers did not patrol in large armies; rather there were many smaller groups or raiding parties. Most of these battles were driven by the desire for domination and the intention to intimidate other cities. During this time it was not uncommon that the victors of a battle would take captives back to their cities and use them for ritual sacrifice. In some instances they would bind or hinder the captive so that he could not fairly compete in a winner-take-all ballcourt match. Herein, the loser would be beheaded and the victor would, in certain situations, keep his head as a trophy and confirm victory in order to establish his city's dominance.

In the Popul Vuh, the vision of human sacrifice and decapitation is abundantly clear and emphasized. However, in instances of decapitation, the sacrifice was intended to signify rebirth and creation. This theme is confirmed when the Hero Twins played the Lords of Death in a ball game match and ended up tricking the Lords of Death into decapitating themselves. With the Lords of Death out of the picture, the Hero Twins were able to resurrect their father, the Maize God. This shows the significance of sacrifice and decapitation in warfare as a means to reenact rebirth, in the Popul Vuh.

=== Maya art ===
Maya art and iconography is a major source to anthropologists' knowledge and beliefs about the culture and history of the Maya. For instance, at the site of Bonampak, photographer Giles Healy discovered exquisite murals showing a battle and its aftermath, including the torture of captives. Other examples of Maya art depicting sacrifice and torture include carved stone stelae, altars, and panels. There is evidence that this type of art was recorded on wood and other perishable media, but they have eroded with time.

Iconographic depictions of trophy heads tend to show the heads being suspended in midair, held by the hair, or even upside down. In addition they depict blood or possibly other fluids flowing from the neck, eyes or mouth. Holding a head by the hair is seen as a sign of disrespect. In Maya iconography, these heads are usually fastened upright with the eyes opened and are worn on a belt that is positioned on the small of the wearer's back. The actual act of decapitation in the iconography is rare but does appear from time to time. The most common place to see the decapitation of human heads being worn or presented as trophy heads are on painted cylinder vases of the Late Classic period and usually involve the Hero Twins or some type of Creation myth.

== Archaeological examples ==
=== In the Southwest of Mexico ===
In Oaxaca there are various pre-Columbian figures in which high-ranking characters, warriors and ball players wear ritual and military paraphernalia, holding inverted heads with their loose, long hair hanging down. One of these figures can be seen in the National Museum of the American Indian in Washington. Javier Urcid writes that these trophies may have been "soft parts of decapitated heads [sic] (Note: Decapitation is the act of removing a head; therefore, although bodies can be decapitated, heads can only be severed.) turned into relics to hang" There are also several figures showing characters with facial skin on their faces: the skin of a flayed human. Urcid’s article in El Sacrificio Humano en la Tradición Religiosa Mesoamericana includes eight illustrations of these trophies in the southern west of Mexico, including a brazier depicting a ball player with a flayed facial mask, wearing a necklace of human bones and carrying a severed head.

The Relación Geográfica of 1580 mentions the festivity of the tlacaxipehualiztli in the context of human skin as trophies in Oaxaca: "with rods they hit throughout the body until it swelled, and then flayed the bodies and washed the meat with hot water and ate it, and carried the skins in the nearby villages for begging."

=== Los Mangales (Early Preclassic) ===
Los Mangales lies within the Salama Valley in the Northern Highlands of Guatemala. It has been estimated that this site was active from approximately 1000 until 400 BC and was the site of vast, elaborate burials. Three principal mounds entail the main composition of the site, (Str. D6-1) containing varied amounts of adult male crania that have been interpreted as trophy heads or possibly dismembered sacrificial retainers. In addition to the three principal burial mounds, there were multiple burial sites. In particular at burial site 6, there was conclusive evidence of human sacrifice, where were located at least 12 dismembered victims and three possible trophy heads. The heads were found lying inside the crypt with specific individuals. A common trend at this site is that the victims found outside the formal crypt were lying in the prone position (their wrists and ankles were bound tightly together and that they were faced down) and the individuals that were inside the crypt were in the supine position (face up and unbound). However, finding a body in the prone position does not necessarily mean that the individual was a victim of sacrifice. It is believed that finding isolated crania was seen as early evidence of trophy taking in the Maya region.

=== Chalchuapa (Preclassic) ===
Evidence of sacrifice and trophy taking was found at an evacuation site in El Chalchuapa, El Salvador. The remains of 33 individuals were found and had appeared to have been victims of ritual sacrifice that had spanned five different episodes of construction to the structure. Many of the individuals were found to be male and most were lying in the prone position. Of the individuals found it was noted that they were represented as crania and were determined to have been trophy heads. The others had a range of signs of mutilation, including: one individual was missing his/her head, two were cut in half at the waist, one individual was missing his/her legs and another was missing his/her feet. Given the age of the individuals, the absence of grave goods, the positions and placement of the bodies, the lack of grave preparation and the evidence for dismemberment, this site seems to show that these individuals were war captives and then used in a form of ritualistic sacrifice.

=== Cuello, Belize (Late Preclassic) ===
Cuello is a site that provides several examples of decapitation, dismemberment, and sacrifice of young to middle-aged males at public events. Here we see evidence of the sacrifice of children, one of whom appeared to have been decapitated demonstrating the incidence of decapitated individuals in common grounds and public structures. In most mass burials there seem to be primary individuals in the center, surrounded by the remains of others.

=== Colha, Belize (Terminal Classic) ===
In Colha, Belize, archaeologists discovered a large pit next to a stairway near the center of a monumental structure (operation 2010). This "Skull Pit" contained the heads of around 30 individuals. Ten of these were children ranging in age from 6 months to 6 or 7 years old. The remaining 20 individuals were adults. There were cut marks on the crania and the remains were burnt, and the age grouping and the location of the pit has led to multiple conclusions on the reasons behind these sacrifices. One theory is that they were sacrificed as a part of a religious ceremony. Other hypotheses are that the victims were political prisoners treated with ritual violence or that they were ancestors of an elite lineage that was violently deposed.

=== Teotihuacan (Feathered Serpent Pyramid) ===
At this excavation site in Mexico, archaeologists found roughly 72 males. Due to the evidence surrounding them they were determined to be soldiers. The individuals were placed in a series of highly structured graves that were below, and just outside, the pyramid. From the other evidence unearthed, it was found that each individual had between 7 and 11 human maxillae, or human jaw bones, in his possession. These maxillae were mostly worn around the arm, generally on the biceps of soldiers. This was seen as a testament of strength and power that proved that these individuals had been in multiple battles or campaigns. Along with the maxillae, the men had necklaces made of teeth, obsidian projectile points and slate disks located behind their lower back, which were commonly found on Teotihuacan military figures. This led the excavators to believe that these soldiers were of an elite class of warrior, and not just some semi-organized militia.

Along with the remains of apparent soldiers, there were also remains found of other males with rich offerings that would suggest they were members of higher social status. This evidence proved that even at an early stage of Teotihuacan’s existence there was large scale human sacrifice as well as warfare-related symbolism.
