= Teixiptla =

Aztec deity

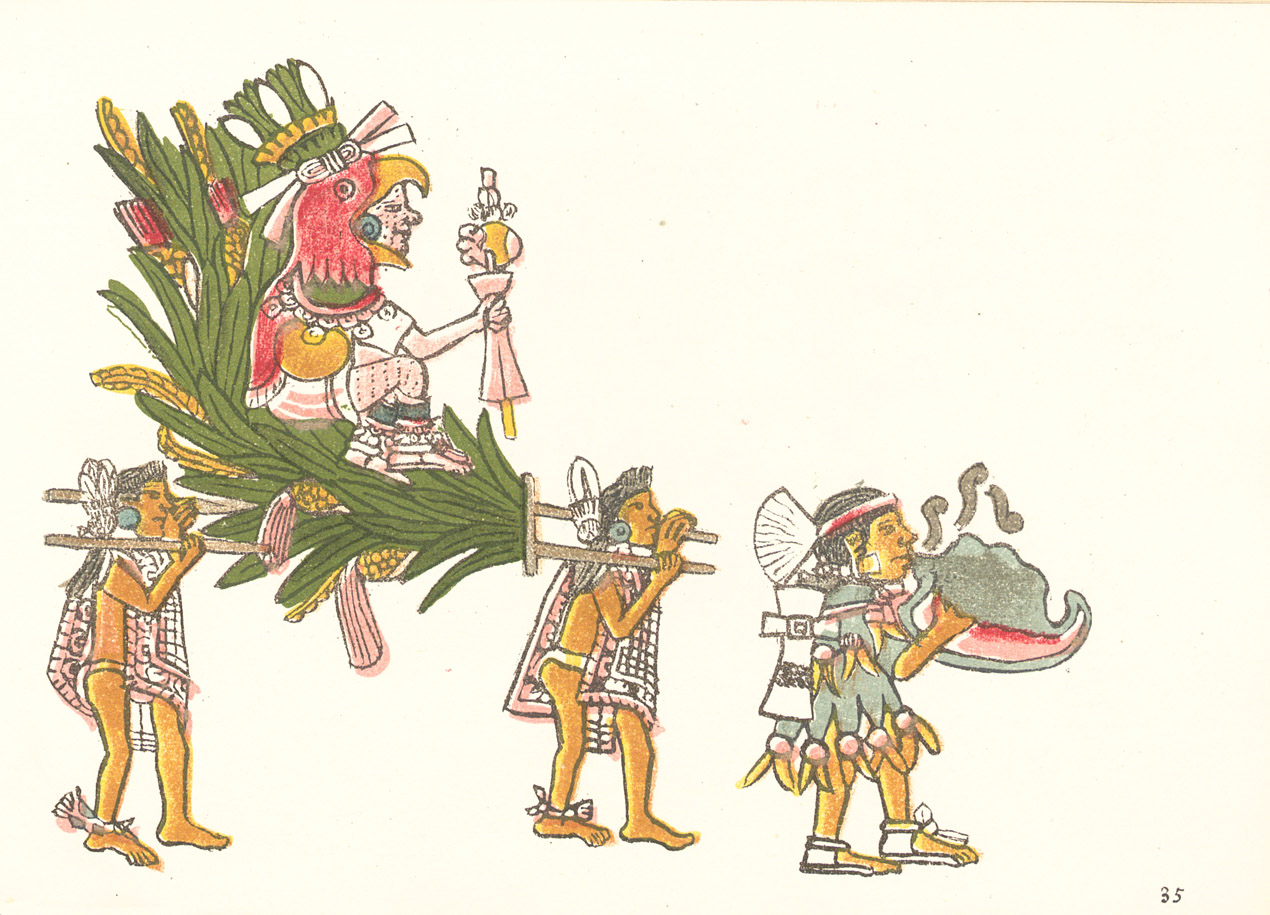
Illustration of a teixiptla in a ritual procession from the Codex Magliabechiano

A teixiptla is a deity embodiment used within Aztec ritual practice. Either a person or sculpture, teixiptlas were fashioned to represent deities and in some cases represent deceased ancestors who were venerated as deities. It was an Aztec belief that through ritual costuming among other processes, the teixiptla assumes the life force/universal power (called teotl) of a deity and becomes their embodiment. These ritual costumes included the flayed skin of sacrificial victims and/or deity regalia which included headdresses and clothing among other accouterments. Teixiptlas were often the ritual centerpiece of Aztec festivals and were present throughout Aztec life in urban centers, countryside, etc.

== Etymology ==
The approximate translations of “teixiptla” from Nahuatl to English are “impersonator”, representative”, “substitute”, and “image”, however the etymology of the word suggests a much more intimate and complex concept beyond these definitions. The word combines the morphemes xip and ixtli meaning “to flay” or “to peel the skin” and “eye/face/surface”, respectively. Additionally, the suffix -tla is present, meaning “to cause someone or something to be or to be treated as or to be characterized”. The result is the word “ixiptla” which translates to “to cause someone or something to be treated/be treated as/be characterized by a flayed (sur)face”.

While this compound word is present in some scholarly accounts, “ixiptla” is not supposed to stand alone without the possessive prefix te- (in English his/hers/theirs/its). This is because the “ixiptla” can only exist through embodying an entity. In other words, the “ixiptla” must take on the “skin” of some entity in order to be “characterized by” it, meaning teixiptla cannot exist independently of its possessor, a fact which is affirmed by the teixiptla’s ritual importance.

== Overview ==
In order to become a teixiptla, both humans and sculptures were adorned as a part of ritual process. The colors, designs, and materials used to dress the teixiptla were specifically and meticulously chosen in order to channel the qualities of the gods so that humans could experience their presence. This means myth, natural phenomena, ritual processes etc. pertaining to the deity represented were all taken into account in the creation of the teixiptla in order to accurately imbue them with “god qualities”. The Florentine Codex gives an account of the adornment of both a priest (titled Topiltzin Quetzalcoatl) and sculpture teixiptla of the god Huitzilopotchtli, named Painal.

"And when day broke, then Painaltzin emerged, they very localized embodiment of Huitzilopochtli. He [Topiltzin Quetzalcoatl] carries him in his arms; the wooden embodiment of Painal was anthropomorphic. He who carries him in his arms is called Topiltzin Quetzalcoatl. He is greatly adorned with a feather device from shoulder to hip. And Painal's embodiment is adorned with his hummingbird disguise, his headdress, his gold banner hanging down, his greenstone necklace and back mirror. All were of teo-turquoise. And he led him, he carried his serpent staff covered in turquoise."

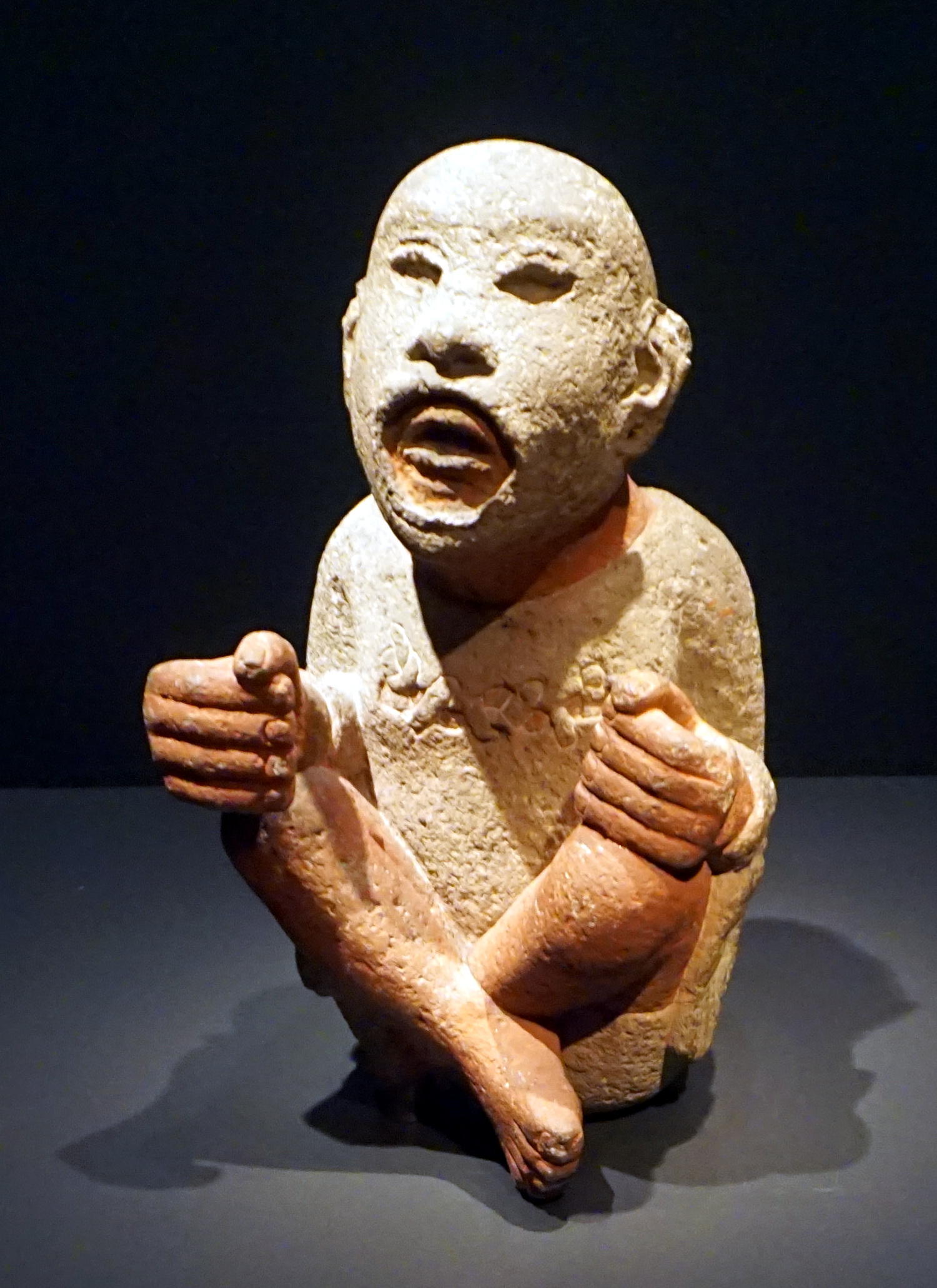
Teixiptla of Aztec deity Xipe Totec, shown wearing the flayed skin of a sacrificial victim

Human teixiptlas were typically slaves purchased to fulfill the ceremonial purpose of deity embodiment. It was common for traders to purchase slaves and travel with them from surrounding communities to Tenochtitlan, where they would then undergo ritual processes such as bathing, dressing, dancing, and at the conclusion of ceremonies, would be brought to a temple and sacrificed. Oftentimes, the costumes donned by human teixiptlas were the flayed skins of sacrificial victims, as the Aztec believed the skin contained the energies of one’s identity, and the act of wearing a skin is the act of assuming a new identity, the one of a deity.

Sculpture teixiptlas were made of either stone, wood, or dough. These figures were anthropomorphic, yet placed more emphasis on ritual attire than correct anatomy. They were either carved fully clothed or nude (meant to be arrayed in ritual attire of another different material later on). These teixiptlas were not seen as lifeless effigies but rather beings already imbued with animacy, as their materials contained teotl and the act of their manufacture summons a deity's presence. Some of these teixiptlas were meant to be permanent, however others were buried or destroyed as a part of ritual.

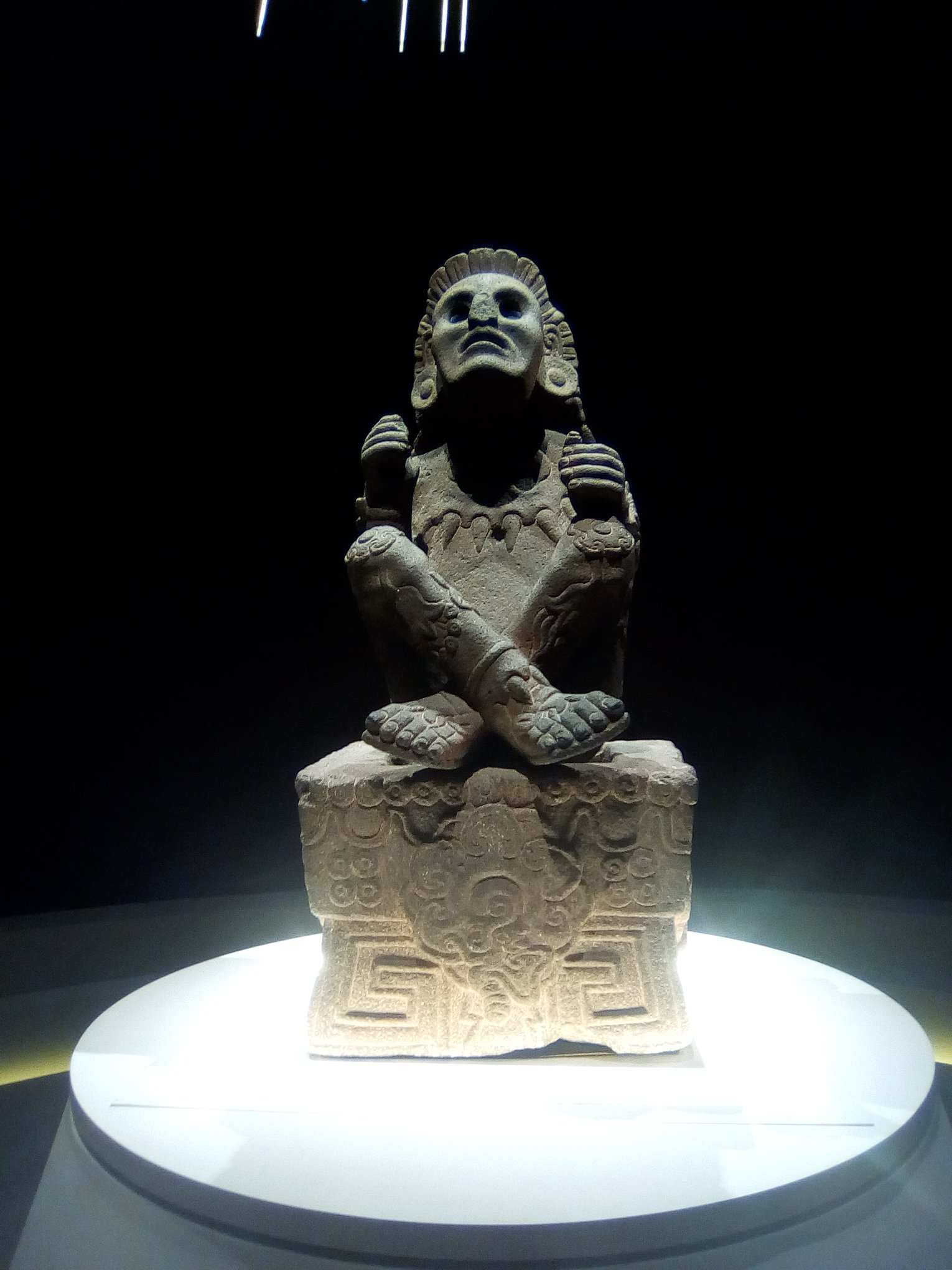
Carved teixiptla of Xochipilli

Certain teixiptlas embodied the ancestral dead instead of a deity. Aztec community leaders were considered to be endowed with higher levels of teotl, as they assumed the responsibility of maintaining harmony between their community and the cosmos. Teixiptlas were created upon the death of these significant community figures as a “ritual affirmation” of that person’s “assimilation” to teotl in their death as well as a “preservation” of their “continual office”. These teixiptlas served as a reminder of the Aztec community’s interdependent relationship with the forces of the universe.
