= Xiuhpōhualli =

365-day calendar used by the Aztecs

Today (at UTC+00)
- Thursday, 5 November 2026
- Aztec: Atlcahualo 14, 1 Mazātl
Other calendars
Akan	Kwayaw
Armenian	18 Trē 1476
Babylonian	23 Tashritu, 2337 SE
Balinese pawukon	Luang, Pepet, Beteng, Sri, Umanis, Was, Wraspati of Sinta, Ludra, Jangur, Duka
Bengali	20 Kartik, BS 1433
Chinese	Yin Water Goat・Well Mansion; Fire Horse Year, Month 9, Day 27 (Shuangjiang, 2 days until Lidong)
Common Era	5 November 2026 CE
Coptic	26 Paopi, AM 1743
Egyptian	23 Phamenoth, 2775 NE
Ethiopian	26 Ṭeqemt, 2019 Amätä Məhrät
French Republican	Décade II, Quartidi de Brumaire de l'Année 235 de la République
Gregorian	5 November, AD 2026
Hebrew	25 Cheshvan, AM 5787
Hindu	Uttaraphalgunī・Indra; Solar: 19 Kārtika, 1948 SE; Lunisolar: Ekādaśī, Kṛishna pakṣa of Āśvina, 2083 VE; Rāudra・5127 KY・1,872,884
Icelandic	Fimmtudagur, 13 Gormánuður 2026
Islamic	24 Jumada al-awwal, AH 1448 (using tabular method)
ISO week date	2026-W45-4
Japanese	26 Nagatsuki, Reiwa 8 (Sōkō, 2 days until Rittō)
Julian	23 October, AD 2026 (AM 7535)
Julian day	2461350
Korean	26 Gaedal, 4359 DE
Maya	13.0.14.1.7; 0 Ceh, 1 Manik
Roman	ante diem X Kalendas Novembres, MMDCCLXXIX AUC
Solar Hijri	14 Aban, SH 1405
Tibetan	26 tha skar, me pho rta 2153 or 1772 or 1000

The xiuhpōhualli (Nahuatl pronunciation: [ʃiʍpoːˈwalːi], from xihuitl (“year”) + pōhualli (“count”)) is a 365-day calendar used by the Aztecs and other pre-Columbian Nahua peoples in central Mexico. It is composed of eighteen 20-day "months," which through Spanish usage came to be known as veintenas (“scores, groups of twenty”), with an inauspicious, separate 5-day period at the end of the year called the nēmontēmi. The name given to the 20-day periods in pre-Columbian times is unknown, and though the Nahuatl word for moon or month, mētztli, is sometimes used today to describe them, the sixteenth-century missionary and ethnographer, Diego Durán explained that:

In ancient times the year was composed of eighteen months, and thus it was observed by these Indian people. Since their months were made of no more than twenty days, these were all the days contained in a month, because they were not guided by the moon but by the days; therefore, the year had eighteen months. The days of the year were counted twenty by twenty.

The xiuhpōhualli calendar (in history known as the "vague year" which means no leap day) had its antecedents in form and function in earlier Mesoamerican calendars, and the 365-day count has a long history of use throughout the region. The Maya civilization version of the xiuhpōhualli is known as the haab', and 20-days period was the uinal. The Maya equivalent of nemontemi is wayeb'. In common with other Mesoamerican cultures the Aztecs also used a separate 260-day calendar (Classical Nahuatl: tōnalpōhualli). The Maya equivalent of the tōnalpōhualli is the tzolk'in. Together, these calendars would coincide once every 52 years, the so-called "calendar round," which was initiated by a New Fire ceremony.

Aztec years were named for the last day of the 18th month according to the 260-day calendar the tōnalpōhualli. The first year of the Aztec calendar round was called 2 Acatl and the last 1 Tochtli. The solar calendar is connected to agricultural practices and holds an important place in Aztec religion, with each month being associated with its own particular religious and agricultural festivals. Each 20-day period starts on a Cipactli (Crocodile) day of the tōnalpōhualli for which a festival is held. The eighteen veintena are listed below. The dates in the chart are from the early eyewitnesses, Diego Durán and Bernardino de Sahagún. Each wrote what they learned from Nahua informants. Sahagún's date precedes the Durán's observations by several decades and is believed to be more recent to the Aztec surrender to the Spanish. Both are shown to emphasize the fact that the beginning of the Native new year became non-uniform as a result of an absence of the unifying force of Tenochtitlan after the Mexica defeat.

== Veintenas of the xiuhpōhualli ==
#	Glyph	Name	Gregorian range		Presiding deities
#	Glyph	Name	Durán	Sahagún	Presiding deities
1		ātl cāhualo (“the water ceases”) cuahuitl ēhua (“the trees rise”)	Mar 01–Mar 20	Feb 02–Feb 21	Water gods
2		tlācaxīpēhualiztli (“flaying of men”)	Mar 21–Apr 09	Feb 22–Mar 13	Xipe Totec
3		tōzōztōntli (“lesser vigil”)	Apr 10–Apr 29	Mar 14–Apr 02	Tlaloc
4		huēyi tōzōztli (“greater vigil”)	Apr 30–May 19	Apr 03–Apr 22	Cinteotl
5		toxcatl (“dryness”)	May 20–Jun 08	Apr 23–May 12	Tezcatlipoca
6		etzalcualiztli (“eating of cooked maize and beans”)	Jun 09–Jun 28	May 13–Jun 01	Tlaloque
7		tēcuilhuitōntli (“lesser feast day”)	Jun 29–Jul 18	Jun 02–Jun 21	Huixtocihuatl
8		huēyi tēcuilhuitōntli (“greater feast day”)	Jul 19–Aug 07	Jun 22–Jul 11	Xilonen
9		tlaxōchimaco (“giving of flowers”) miccāilhuitōntli (“lesser feast day of the dead”)	Aug 08–Aug 27	Jul 12–Jul 31	Huitzilopochtli
10		xocotl huetzi (“the xocotl falls”) huēyi miccāilhuitl (“greater feast day of the dead”)	Aug 28–Sep 16	Aug 01–Aug 20	Xiuhtecuhtli
11		ochpaniztli (“sweeping”)	Sep 17–Oct 06	Aug 21–Sep 09	Teteo Innan
12		teōtlehco (“the gods arrive”)	Oct 07–Oct 26	Sep 10–Sep 29	All the gods
13		tepēilhuitl (“feast day of mountains”)	Oct 27–Nov 15	Sep 30–Oct 19	Mountains
14		quechōlli (“roseate spoonbill”)	Nov 16–Dec 05	Oct 20–Nov 8	Mixcoatl
15		panquetzaliztli (“raising of banners”)	Dec 06–Dec 25	Nov 09–Nov 28	Huitzilopochtli
16		ātemoztli (“descent of water”)	Dec 26–Jan 14	Nov 29–Dec 18	Rain gods
17		tititl (“tightening,” “contraction”)	Jan 15–Feb 03	Dec 19–Jan 07	Tonan
18		izcalli (“offshoot,” “bud”)	Feb 04–Feb 23	Jan 08–Jan 27	Xiuhtecuhtli
–		nēmontēmi (“they fill up in vain”)	Feb 24–Feb 28	Jan 28–Feb 01	None

Aztec years were named for the last day of their fourth month according to the 260-day calendar, the tōnalpōhualli.

== Reconstruction of the calendar ==
For many centuries, scholars have tried to reconstruct the Aztec calendar. A correlation that is accepted in some circles was proposed by professor Rafael Tena (INAH), based on the studies of Sahagún, Durán and Alfonso Caso (UNAM). His correlation argues that the mexica year started on February 13th using the old Julian calendar or February 23rd of the current Gregorian calendar.

== Xiuhpōhualli as a yearly account ==
Xiuhpōhualli meant more than a calendar in the modern sense. According to Camilla Townsend's Fifth Sun: A New History of the Aztecs (2019), the "year count" was an active tradition of recording community history. Before the Spanish conquest, trained Nahua historians would recount their people's history at public gatherings in the courtyards located between palaces and temples. They would proceed year by year, with different speakers providing various perspectives on the same dramatic event. Such performances generally recounted stories of interest to the larger group—the rise and deaths of chiefs, the wars fought, remarkable natural phenomena, and other major events. The speakers imbued the narratives with personality, even sometimes slipping into the present tense as they delivered leaders' lines, as if in a play. Occasionally, they would shout questions that eager audience members were expected to answer.

Following the conquest, indigenous intellectuals adapted this traditional year-by-year framework to the Roman alphabet, writing detailed histories in their native Nahuatl language. Later Western historians would nickname these specific alphabetic historical texts as "annals". As the colonial period progressed, the genre became increasingly terse, transforming into a simple annual record of major events.

== See also ==
- Aztec calendar
- Tianquiztli
