= Aztec New Year =

New year celebration per the Aztec calendar

The Mexica New Year (Spanish: Año Nuevo Mexicano or Año Nuevo Azteca; Nahuatl languages: Yancuic Xīhuitl, pronounced [ˈjaŋkʷik ˈʃiːwit͡ɬ]) is the celebration of the new year according to the Aztec calendar. The date on which the holiday falls in the Gregorian calendar depends on the version of the calendar used, but it is generally considered to occur at sunrise on 12 March. The holiday is observed in some Nahua communities in Mexico. To celebrate, ocote (pitch-pine) candles are lit on the eve of the new year, along with fireworks, drumming, and singing. Some of the most important events occur in Huauchinango, Naupan, Mexico City, Zongolica, and Xicotepec.

The latest and more accepted version was proposed by professor Rafael Tena (INAH), based on the studies of Durán, Sahagún and Alfonso Caso (UNAM). His correlation confirms that the first day of the Mexica year was February 13th according to the old Julian calendar or February 23rd of the current Gregorian calendar. Using the same count, it has been verified the date of the birth of Huitzilopochtli, the end of the year and a cycle or "Tie of the Years," and the New Fire Ceremony, day-sign "1 Tecpatl" of the year "2 Acatl," corresponding to the date February 22nd.

This 365-day calendar was corresponded with the solar year, was divided into 18 'months' of 20 days each, plus 5 'nameless' days at the end of the year. Also, there are some codices that show the existence of the leap year.

== See also ==
- Aztec calendar
- New Fire Ceremony
- Mesoamerican calendars
