= Tōxcatl =

Day of the Aztec calendar on which an annual festival was held for the god Tezcatlipoca

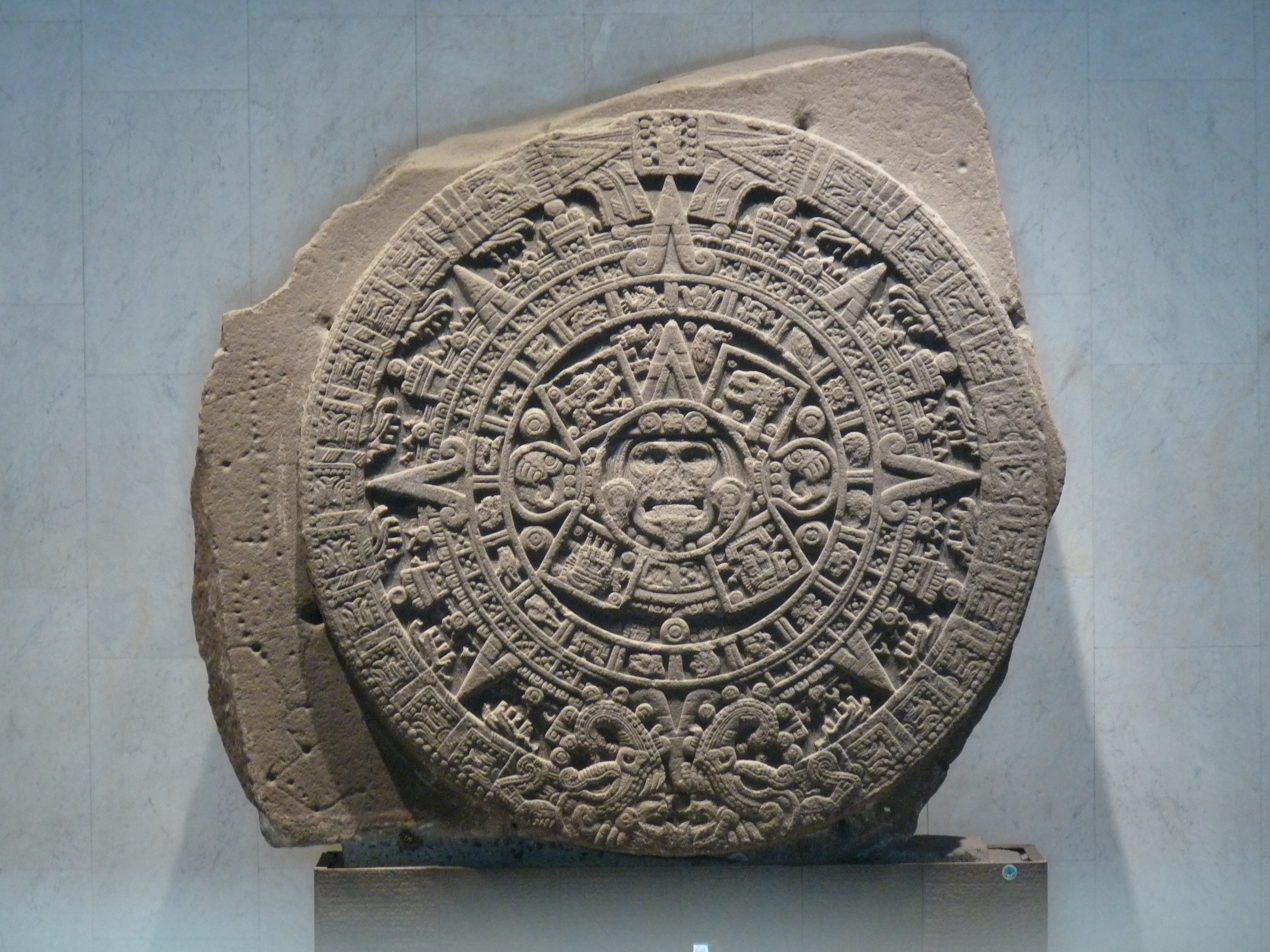
The Aztec "Sun stone" presenting elements of the Aztec calendar.

Toxcatl (Nahuatl pronunciation: [ˈtoːʃkat͡ɬ]) was the name of the fifth twenty-day month or "veintena" of the Aztec calendar which lasted approximately from the 5th to the 22nd of May, and of the festival which was held every year in this month. The Festival of Toxcatl was dedicated to the god Tezcatlipoca and featured the sacrifice of a young man who had been impersonating the deity for a full year.

The Toxcatl Massacre, a turning point in the Spanish conquest of Mexico, occurred when the Spaniards who were tolerated as guests in Tenochtitlan attacked and massacred the unprepared Aztecs during the celebration of Toxcatl. This caused the outbreak of open hostilities between the Aztecs and Spaniards, and during the Noche Triste a few weeks later the Spaniards fled the city.

== Calendrics ==
The Aztec calendar was composed of two separate cycles—one of 260 days called the tonalpohualli (day count) and one of 365 days called the xiuhpohualli (year count).

The 365-day xiuhpohualli consisted of 18 twenty-day "months" (or veintenas), plus an additional 5 days at the end of the year. Some descriptions of the Aztec calendar state that it also included a leap day which allowed the calendar cycle to remain aligned with the same agrarian cycles year after year. But other descriptions state that the leap year was unknown to the Aztecs and that the correlation of the months to the astronomical year would change over time.

In any case, from the descriptions of Spanish conquistadors who witnessed the celebration of Toxcatl in 1521 we know that in that year the feast fell in our month of May.

== Etymology ==
According to Fray Diego Durán the name Toxcatl derives from the Nahuatl verb toxcahuia meaning "wither from thirst". Toxcatl then means "drought". Many other meanings have since been proposed for the name - many having to do with the necklaces of grilled maize that were worn by the revellers during the festivities. The Aztecs also used the name Tepopochtli (smoking or fumigation) to refer to the month of Toxcatl. The name of the corresponding month in other Mesoamerican cultures often have to do with smoke, steam or clouds. The Otomi word for the feast was Atzibiphi, biphi meaning smoke. The Kaqchikel name was Cibixic, meaning "cloudy smoke". The Matlatzinca word for the feast however was Unditini meaning "we are going to grill maize".

== The Festival ==
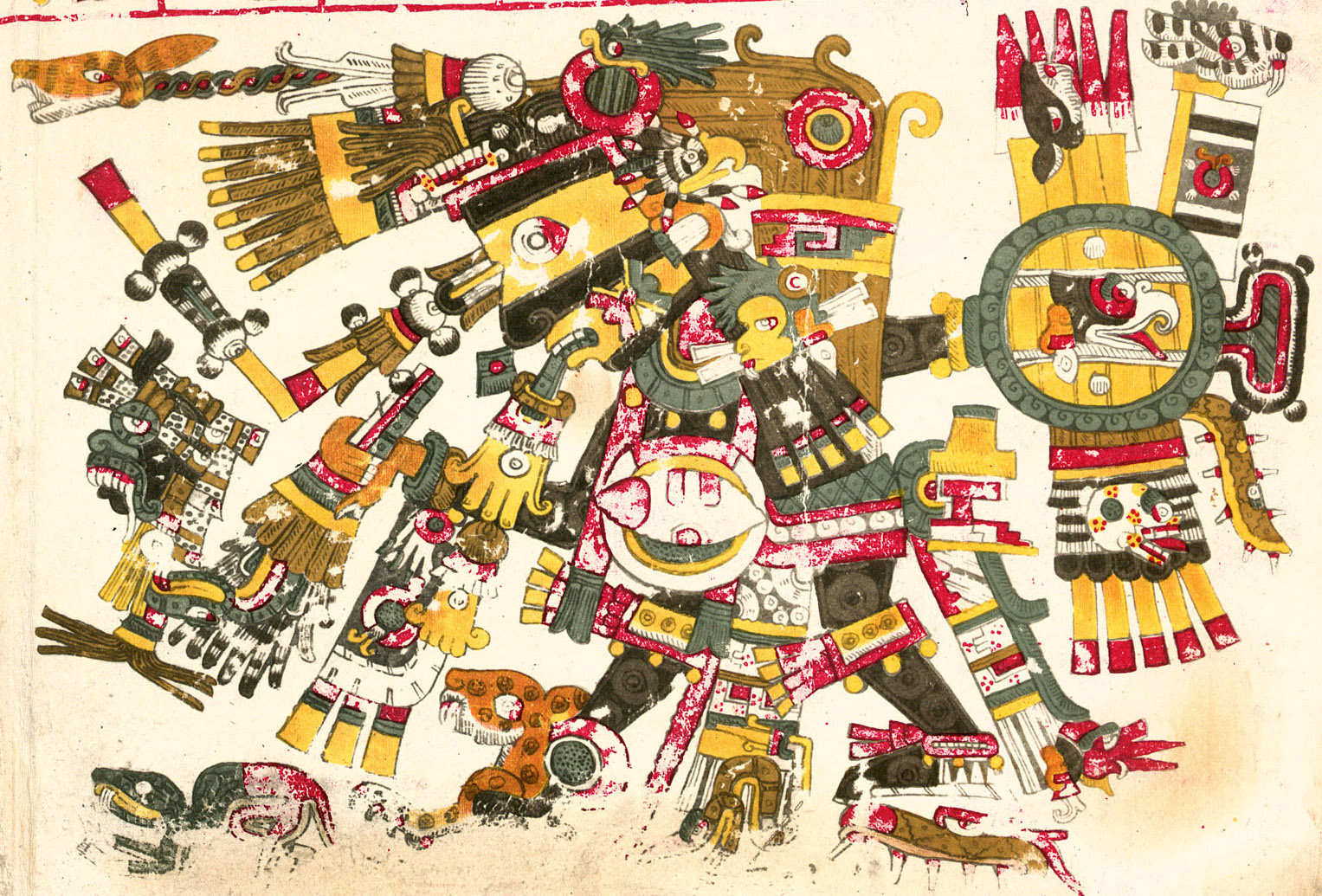
The Aztec god Tezcatlipoca depicted in the Codex Borgia.

The rituals which the Aztecs carried out during the feast of Toxcatl are described by Bernardino de Sahagún in the Florentine Codex, in Fray Duráns description of the gods and rites, and in the chronicle of Juan Bautista Pomar.

The most important part of the Toxcatl ritual was the sacrifice of a young man who had been impersonating Tezcatlipoca since the last Toxcatl festival, and the selection of a new man to take that role in the year to come.

The youth chosen to be the ixiptlatli (impersonator) of Tezcatlipoca was normally a war captive. He was taught courtly speech, singing and to play the flute. Throughout the year he would parade in the streets of Tenochtitlan and be treated with great reverence. His skin was painted black except for a ribbon across his eyes, he was dressed in precious jewellery and cotton embroidered clothes. He wore a snail-shell lip pendant, eagle down headdress, turquoise bracelets and golden bells on his ankles.

He walked about the city playing the flute, smoking tobacco and smelling flowers, and people would salute him as the living image of the god. At the building called Quauhxicalco he would sometimes burn copal incense and play his flute. Several times during the year he would meet with the Aztec ruler, the tlatoani, who would ritually adorn him. In the month of Huey Tozoztli which preceded Toxcatl, he would be ritually wed to four maidens who impersonated the goddesses Xochiquetzal, Xilonen, Atlatonan and Huixtocihuatl, and he lived with them for twenty days. Four days before the main ceremony the tlatoani secluded himself in his palace and the Tezcatlipoca impersonator and his four wives paraded through the city. On the fifth day they travelled by canoe to a place called Acaquilpan, here he was left to himself by his wives near the temple Tlacochcalco ("In the House of Darts"). He then freely walked up the stairs of the pyramid, breaking a flute on each step. At the summit the priests would lay him on a sacrificial stone, open his chest with an obsidian dagger, and remove his heart. He was beheaded and his skull was placed on the tzompantli (skull rack), his body was flayed and his flesh was distributed among the nobles of the city and eaten. The warcaptive who was to be the next impersonator of Tezcatlipoca also took part in the flesh and probably also wore the skin of his predecessor.

During the feast other deity impersonators were also sacrificed. Offerings of food, flowers and paper banners were made throughout the festival, and as the offerings were presented the people danced the "Leap of Toxcatl". Men would also perform the dance of "the Serpent", and the women a dance named "Grilled Corn". During these dances there would be kissing and playing between men and women. After the dances the participants were ritually scarred by the priests of Tezcatlipoca (the tlatlacanahualtin).

A lifesize figure of Huitzilipochtli was made of amaranth dough then painted, dressed and decorated with clothes and gold jewelry that were symbols of the deity. The sculpture was built on a platform and was carried about. The female attendants who had ground the seeds, made the dough and dressed the sculpture had fasted for a year as part their ritualistic role.

When Pedro de Alverado thought he had evidence against the Aztecs to think that they were going to attack the Spaniards, he ordered his men to attack the Aztecs during this festival. Many people died including some of the village nobles.

== Interpretations ==
Eduard Seler saw the Toxcatl ritual as symbol of the change of season represented as the death and rebirth of Tezcatlipoca. He likens Toxcatl to its K'iche' Maya equivalent, the feast of Jun Raqan, which is the celebration of the new year. Michel Graulich, who advocates a different calendrical correlation, places Toxcatl in the fall and sees the festival as a harvest feast celebrating the abundance of maize. Olivier (2003) stresses the importance of the actions of the tlatoani in the ritual and sees the feast as a way for the ruler to offer a worthy sacrifice to the lord of rulership, Tezcatlipoca.
