= Winter Clothes Day =

Chinese traditional festival

- Official name: Winter Clothes Day (寒衣节)
- Type: Cultural, Asian
- Date: 1st day of the 10th month in the Chinese calendar

Winter Clothes Day
- Traditional Chinese: 寒衣節
- Simplified Chinese: 寒衣节
- Literal meaning: "Winter clothing festival"
Transcriptions
Standard Mandarin
- Hanyu Pinyin: Hányī jié

Winter Clothes Day, or Hanyi Festival, together with Tomb-sweeping Day and Hungry Ghost Festival, are the days for people to offer sacrifice to their ancestors in China. The Winter Clothes Day falls on the first day of the 10th month of the Chinese calendar. Shiyue first of the lunar calendar has come into winter, thus people feel cold, which makes them miss the dead. To protect their ancestors against the cold in the netherworld, people send clothes to them, which is why it is called the Winter Clothes Day. On Shiyue first, people in China (mostly in the North) burn clothes made of colorful papers in front of graves to their ancestors to keep them warm. At the same time, the day marks the arrival of the dead of winter. Consequently, it's the day for parents and lovers to send clothes to the livings who they care about. As time goes by, the day becomes the festival for people to offer sacrifice to their ancestors.

== Origin ==
=== Meng Jiangnu ===
According to a legend, the origin of the Winter Clothes Day is related to a beautiful and sad love story. In Qin dynasty, the first emperor of Qin reunited China, and established a new country. However, he lived an extravagant and dissipated life, and recruited laborers to build the Great Wall and his own mausoleum. It is said that during the Qin dynasty, there lived a family named Meng who planted a gourd in their yard. The leaves and branches were so long that they stretched over the wall, and into the yard of their neighbor named Jiang. Before long, the neighbor named Jiang had a giant gourd in their yard. When the gourd became mature, Meng and Jiang agreed to cut the gourd into two parts for each of them. However, when they cut it, they found an adorable girl there. Both of them loved her very much. After discussion, they drew a conclusion that the girl was going to be nurtured by Meng. She was named Meng Jiangnu. When Meng Jiangnu grew up, she was very famous for being pretty, versatile and obedient. She was the apple of the two families' eyes. One day, when Meng Jiangnu was trying to pull a fan out of a pool, a young man named Fan Xiliang passed by, and saw her. He came to help her get the fan, and she thanked him. After she looked closely at the handsome youth, she chatted with him favorably. Gradually, they fell in love with each other. With their parents' permissions, Meng Jiangnu was married to Fan Xiliang.

On their wedding night, a contingent of troops broke into their house, and took Fan Xiliang away because he was recruited as a laborer by the first emperor of Qin to build the Great Wall far away. After Fan Xiliang was taken away, Meng Jiangnu missed him day and night with great sadness and a heavy heart. On Shiyue first, it snowed heavily outside. When she stared at the candles and the big snowfall, she thought of how her husband had left without taking any warm clothes to defend against the cold, so she wiped tears sadly. Meng Jiangnu missed her husband so much that she had a dream. In her dream, she saw her husband standing on the Great Wall. Grabbing a spear, her husband was clothed in ragged garments in a world of ice and snow. When he fought against enemies, his head was cut off by an enemy, rolling down the Great Wall with blood everywhere. Meng Jiangnu woke up screaming, and found it a nightmare. She strongly believed the dream meant something bad, therefore, she was determined to send clothes to him and to figure out what had happened. She made winter clothes for her husband overnight, and packed up her luggage, including her husband's winter clothes. After saying goodbye to her parents, she left for the Great Wall to find her husband. Though she suffered a lot, with her determination and help from nice people, she finally reached the Great Wall which was being built. Unfortunately, she was told that her husband had died of overwork and his body was buried under the Great Wall. Hearing the news, she was shocked and passed out. After the wind woke her up, she couldn't help bursting into crying. She beat the Great Wall hard, and called out her husband's name when she cried. She cried for a while, and then censured the first emperor of the Qin dynasty for his tyrannies. With her accusations, sharp wind blew up, and furious billows rolled and came towards the Great Wall. Suddenly, a loud noise occurred, one part of the Great Wall collapsed, and a skeleton was uncovered. Meng Jiangnu stayed with the skeleton and cried for seven days. Then, she burnt the winter clothes that she made for her husband. The ashes of the clothes flew upward with the wind, circled her three times, and finally covered the skeleton steadily. Gradually, the legend of Meng Jiangnu sending winter clothes has evolved into a festival which people call Winter Clothes Day.

== Customs ==
=== Eating glutinous rice and red beans ===
Red bean rice or hóngdòu fàn (红豆饭) is a traditional Chinese dish eaten in some regions of China, it is particularly common in Jiangsu province during the Winter Clothes Day. A legend from Dafeng, Jiangsu says that people eat a bowl of glutinous rice mixed with red beans on the Winter Clothes Day in Jiangsu to commemorate a shepherd boy who revolted against a landlord. It is said that a long time ago, an adorable shepherd boy was born into a poor family. His parents could not support him, so he made a living by shepherding for a landlord when he was a child. One day, his carelessness in tending to the sheep resulted in those sheep falling into a valley and dying. After hearing the news, the landlord was extremely angry. Consequently, he beat and scolded the shepherd boy. The shepherd boy begged for the landlord to stop the beating but he did not. When the shepherd boy believed that he was on the brink of death, he picked up a knife next to him, and killed the landlord. The blood of the shepherd boy stained the glutinous rice on the ground red. By coincidence, that day was the 1st of Shiyue.

=== Fighting a battle with pumpkins ===
The Bouyei nationality who live in Guizhou Province, China celebrate the Winter Clothes Day by fighting a battle with pumpkins. According to a legend, the purpose of fighting a battle with pumpkins is to please ancestors, to scare ghosts away, and to protect earth. On Shiyue first in Chinese lunar calendar, teenagers of the Bouyei nationality choose a pumpkin from their gardens, and thrust the pumpkin with a sharp bamboo pole. When the ceremony of sending ancestors off is over, teenagers burn a bundle of incense and stick them into pumpkins. Once the leader of their village shouts, teenagers run to the wild, with bamboo poles held in their hands, to gather together with others from other villages. When they encounter teenagers from other villages, all of them pretend to abuse each other and to fight with each other with pumpkins. Finally, singing a song, they go back to their own villages smilingly.

=== Burning winter clothes ===
On the day before Shiyue first in Chinese lunar calendar, the elders lead children and grandchildren to add soils to their ancestors' graves. The soils should be carried by their clothes rather than baskets. The more soils they added, the more populations their families would have. On Shiyue first, in patriarch's leadership, male carried foods and abundant tributes to worship ancestors' graves, and to offer sacrifice to their ancestors. After the ceremony, what's most important is to burn winter clothes made by colorful paper, including red, yellow, blue, black and purple paper. There is a popular belief in China that if you want to deliver something to the dead, you must burn it completely. Otherwise, the dead could not receive it. This belief is linked with the story of Cai Mo burnt paper. The Winter Clothes Day is not only the day to deliver winter clothes to the dead, but also the day for the livings to prepare for the coming of winter. On that day, women take out winter clothes that they have made for their children and husbands, and ask them to try clothes on. Men are used clearing up fireplaces and chimneys to make sure that fireplaces and chimneys can keep the house warm when winter comes.

==== The Story of Cai Mo burnt paper ====
It's also said that burning winter clothes on the Winter Clothes Day originated from a businessman's promotion strategy. According to historical records, paper was invented by a man named Cai Lun during the Eastern Han dynasty (25–220 AD). After Cai Lun invented the paper, many people came to his paper factory to purchase the paper. When Cai Lun's sister-in-law named Hui Niang found that papermaking was profitable, she persuaded her husband named Cai Mo to learn papermaking form his brother. However, her husband was not very patient. He set up his own paper factory before he was skilled at making paper, leading to that no one came to his factory to buy paper because of its low quality. Hui Niang tried to help her husband get away from the trouble. Suddenly, an idea occurred to her mind. One night, she pretended to be ill and died. Her husband was extremely sad and guilty for he thought her death partly resulted from his behaviors. He blamed himself when he burnt the paper made by himself. Unexpectedly, a sound coming from the coffin appeared, which scared the people in mourning hall. It was Hui Niang's voice. She said, "Open the coffin, hurry up. I have come back". When people opened the coffin, Hui Ning jumped out from it and told people, "Paper in this world becomes money in the nether world. I could not come back without my husband burning paper to me. The king of hell originally planned to torture me. Luckily, I used money to bribe him and ghosts. Then, they sent me back to earth". Then, her husband took two piles of paper to burn to his parents, hoping it could make his parents have a better life in the nether world. After witnessing the function of paper, people in mourning hall started to buy the paper from Cai Mo's paper factory to burn. The story of Hui Niang spread quickly, therefore, unmarketable paper of Cai Mo's paper factory sold out within a few days. The day was Shiyue first of the lunar calendar when Hui Niang "returned back from hell", so people gradually offered sacrifice to their ancestors in front of their graves by burning paper.

== Sources ==
- 《中国家族文化》("《孟姜女传》与寒衣的由来"P103----P107），Author: 凯祥， Press： 百花洲文艺出版社， 2012-10.
- 《节气时令吃什么》，("十月初一——寒衣" P187），Author：王明强，Press：江苏科学技术出版社，2013-11-01.
- 《中国传统节日趣闻与传说》，("寒衣"，P208---P210), Author：严敬群，Press：金盾出版社，2010-08.
- 《图解民俗大全-精编美绘版》，（"关心先人的送寒衣"， P230---P231), Author：万虹， Press：内蒙古文化，2012-5-1.
- 《中国民间传说人物-哭倒长城八百里:孟姜女(双色)》，（"孟姜女哭倒'魏长城'及'送寒衣'的来历" P214---P130），Author：强军宏，Press：东北师大，2012-3-1.
- 《中国节日传统文化读本（珍藏版）》，("寒衣的习俗"P268---P269), Author:严敬群 ，Press:东方出版社，2009-11.
- 《最后的风景》，("哀哀寒衣 "，P149---P151），Author：金光 ， Press：大众文艺出版社，2009-04.
- 《中华民俗常识一本通》，("送寒衣"，P45), Author:张建霞，Press:中国三峡出版社，2011-11.
