= Veintena =

20-day period used in pre-Columbian Mesoamerican calendars

A veintena is the Spanish-derived name for a 20-day period used in pre-Columbian Mesoamerican calendars. The division is often casually referred to as a "month", although it is not coordinated with the lunar cycle. The term is most frequently used with respect to the 365-day Aztec calendar, the xiuhpohualli, although 20-day periods are also used in the 365-day Maya calendar (the Mayan tun), as well as by other Mesoamerican civilizations such as the Zapotec and Mixtec.

The 365-day cycle is divided into 18 veintenas of 20 days each, giving 360 days; an additional 5 "nameless days" or nemontemi are appended to bring the total to 365.

The name used for these periods in pre-Columbian times is unknown. In Nahuatl, the word for "twenty days" is cempōhualilhuitl [sempoːwalˈilwit͡ɬ] from the words cempōhualli [sempoːˈwalːi] "twenty" and ilhuitl [ˈilwit͡ɬ] "day". Through Spanish usage, the 20-day period of the Aztec calendar has become commonly known as a veintena. The Aztec word for moon is metztli, and this word is today to describe these 20-day periods, although as the sixteenth-century missionary and early ethnographer, Diego Durán explained:

In ancient times the year was composed of eighteen months, and thus it was observed by these Indian people. Since their months were made of no more than twenty days, these were all the days contained in a month, because they were not guided by the moon but by the days; therefore, the year had eighteen months. The days of the year were counted twenty by twenty.

Each 20-day period started on a Cipactli (Crocodile) day of the tonalpohualli for which a festival was held. The eighteen veintena are listed below. The dates in the chart are from the early eyewitnesses, Diego Durán and Bernardino de Sahagún. Each wrote what they learned from Nahua informants. Sahagún's date precedes the Durán's observations by several decades and is believed to be more recent to the Aztec surrender to the Spanish. Both are shown to emphasize the fact that the beginning of the Native new year became non-uniform as a result of an absence of the unifying force of Tenochtitlan after the Mexica defeat.

Duran Time	Sahagun Time	Fiesta Names	Symbol	English Translation
1. MAR 01 - MAR 20	1. FEB 02 - FEB 21	Atlcahualo, Cuauhitlehua		Ceasing of Water, Rising Trees
2. MAR 21 - APR 09	2. FEB 22 - MAR 13	Tlacaxipehualiztli		Rites of Fertility; Xipe-Totec
3. APR 10 - APR 29	3. MAR 14 - APR 02	Tozoztonli	..	Small Perforation
4. APR 30 - MAY 19	4. APR 03 - APR 22	Huey Tozotli	.	Great Perforation
5. MAY 20 - JUN 08	5. APR 23 - MAY 12	Toxcatl	..	Dryness
6. JUN 09 - JUN 28	6. MAY 13 - JUN 01	Etzalcualiztli.		Eating Maize and Beans
7. JUN 29 - JULY 18	7. JUN 02 - JUN 21	Tecuilhuitontli		Feast for the Revered Ones
8. JULY 19 - AUG 07	8. JUN 22 - JUL 11	Huey Tecuilhuitl		Feast for the Greatly Revered Ones
9. AUG 08 - AUG 27	9. JUL 12 - JUL 31	Miccailhuitontli		Feast to the Revered Deceased
10. AUG 28 - SEP 16	10. AUG01 - AUG 20	Huey Miccailhuitontli		Feast to the Greatly Revered Deceased
11. SEPT 17 - OCT 06	11. AUG 21 - SEPT 09	Ochpaniztli		Sweeping and Cleaning
12. OCT 07 - OCT 26	12. SEPT10 - SEPT 29	Teotleco		Return of the Gods
13. OCT 27 - NOV 15	13. SEPT 30 - OCT 19	Tepeilhuitl		Feast for the Mountains
14. NOV 16 - DEC 05	14. OCT 20 - NOV 8	Quecholli		Precious Feather
15. DEC 06 - DEC 25	15. NOV 09 - NOV 28	Panquetzaliztli	...	Raising the Banners
16. DEC 26 - JAN 14	16. NOV 29 - DEC 18	Atemoztli		Descent of the Water
17. JAN 15 - FEB 03	17. DEC 19 - JAN 07	Tititl		Stretching for Growth
18. FEB 04 - FEB 23	18. JAN 08 - JAN 27	Izcalli		Encouragement for the Land & People
18u. FEB 24 - FEB 28	18u.JAN 28 - FEB 01	nemontemi (5 day period)		Empty-days (nameless, undefined)

== See also ==
- Aztec calendar
