= Aztec calendar =

Calendar system that was used by the Aztecs

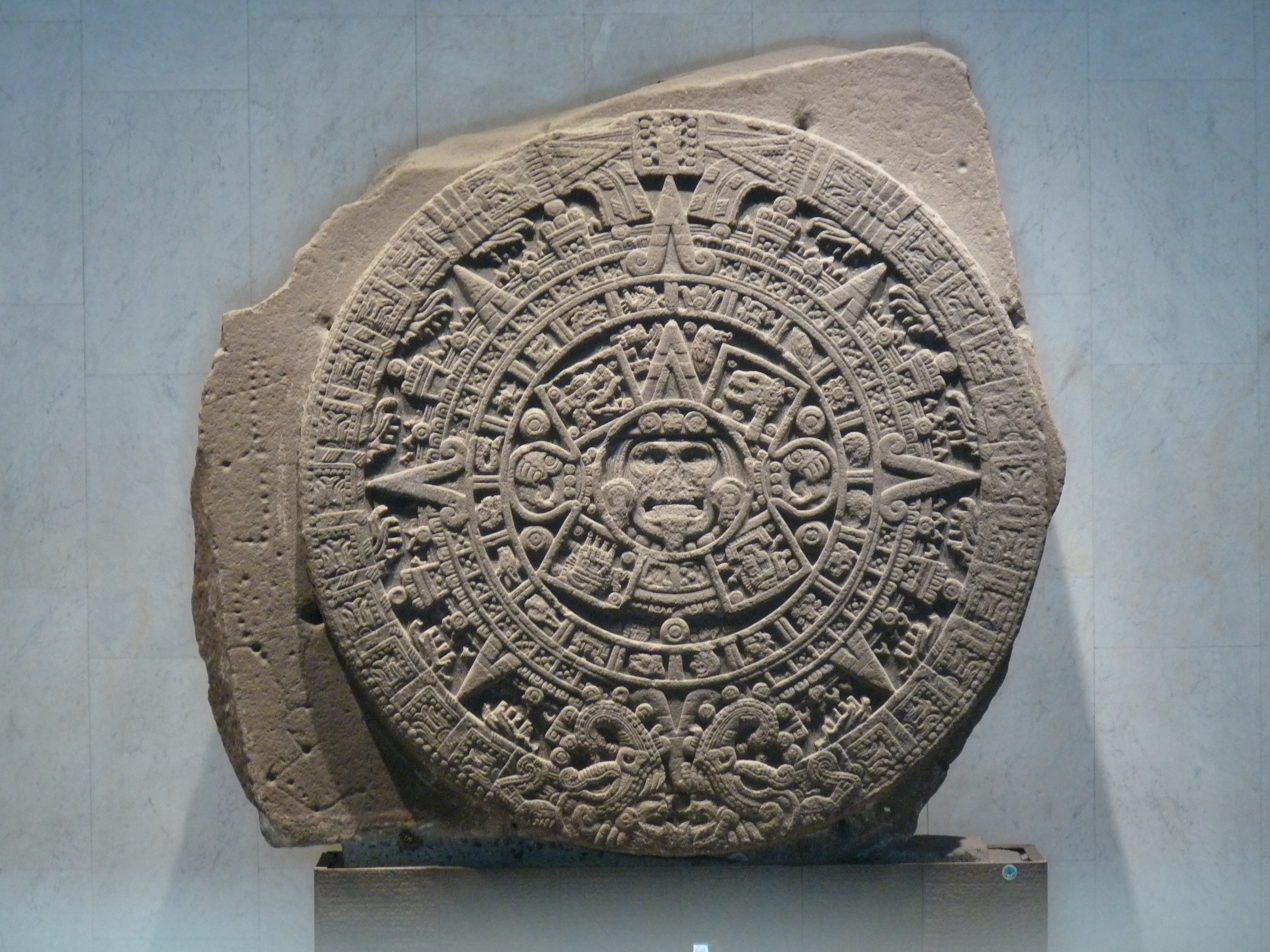
The Aztec sun stone depicts calendrical symbols on its inner ring but did not function as an actual calendar.

The Aztec or Mexica calendar is the calendrical system used by the Aztecs as well as other Pre-Columbian peoples of central Mexico. It is one of the Mesoamerican calendars, sharing the basic structure of calendars from throughout the region. The Aztec sun stone, often erroneously called the calendar stone, is on display at the National Museum of Anthropology in Mexico City. The actual Aztec calendar consists of a 365-day calendar cycle called xiuhpōhualli (year count), and a 260-day ritual cycle called tōnalpōhualli (day count). These two cycles together form a 52-year "century", sometimes called the "calendar round". The xiuhpōhualli is considered to be the agricultural calendar, since it is based on the sun, and the tōnalpōhualli is considered to be the sacred calendar.

== Tōnalpōhualli, Aztec Sacred Calendar ==
The tōnalpōhualli ("day count") consists of a cycle of 260 days, each day signified by a combination of a number from 1 to 13, and one of the twenty day signs. With each new day, both the number and day sign would be incremented: 1. Crocodile is followed by 2. Wind, 3. House, 4. Lizard, and so forth up to 13. Reed. After Reed, the cycle of numbers would restart (though the twenty day signs had not yet been exhausted), resulting in 1. Jaguar, 2. Eagle, and so on, as the days immediately following 13. Reed. This cycle of number and day signs would continue similarly until the 20th week, which would start on 1. Rabbit, and end on 13. Flower. It would take a full 260 days (13×20) for the two cycles (of twenty day signs, and thirteen numbers) to realign and repeat the sequence back to 1. Crocodile.

=== Day signs ===
The set of day signs used in central Mexico is identical to that used by Mixtecs, and to a lesser degree similar to those of other Mesoamerican calendars. Each of the day signs bear an association with one of the four cardinal directions.

There is some variation in the way the day signs were drawn or carved. Those here were taken from the Codex Magliabechiano.

Image	Nahuatl name	Pronunciation	English translation	Direction
	Cipactli	[siˈpáktɬi]	Crocodile; Alligator; Caiman; Crocodilian Monster; Dragon	East
	Ehēcatl	[eʔˈéːkatɬ]	Wind	North
	Calli	[ˈkálːi]	House	West
	Cuetzpalin	[kʷetsˈpálin̥]	Lizard	South
	Cōātl	[ˈkóːwaːtɬ]	Serpent; Snake	East
	Miquiztli	[miˈkístɬi]	Death	North
	Mazātl	[ˈmásaːtɬ]	Deer; Animal	West
	Tōchtli	[ˈtóːtʃtɬi]	Rabbit	South
	Ātl	[ˈaːtɬ]	Water	East
	Itzcuīntli	[itsˈkʷíːn̥tɬi]	Dog	North

Image	Nahuatl name	Pronunciation	English translation	Direction
	Ozomahtli	[osoˈmáʔtɬi]	Monkey	West
	Malīnalli	[maliːˈnálːi]	Grass	South
	Ācatl	[ˈáːkatɬ]	Reed	East
	Ocēlōtl	[oːˈséːloːtɬ]	Ocelot; Jaguar	North
	Cuāuhtli	[ˈkʷáːʍtɬi]	Eagle	West
	Cōzcacuāuhtli	[koːskaˈkʷáːʍtɬi]	Vulture	South
	Ōlīn	[ˈoːliːn̥]	Movement; Quake; Earthquake	East
	Tecpatl	[ˈtékpatɬ]	Flint; Flint Knife	North
	Quiyahuitl	[kiˈjáwitɬ]	Rain	West
	Xōchitl	[ˈʃoːtʃitɬ]	Flower	South

Wind and Rain are represented by images of their associated gods, Ehēcatl and Tlāloc respectively.

Other marks on the stone showed the current world, and the worlds before this one. Each world was called a sun, and each sun had its own species of inhabitants. The Aztecs believed that they were in the Fifth Sun, and like all of the suns before them, they would also eventually perish due to their own imperfections. Every 52 years was marked out due to the belief that 52 years was a life cycle and at the end of any given life cycle, the gods could take all they had, and destroy the world.

=== Trecenas ===
The 260 days of the sacred calendar were grouped into twenty periods of 13 days each. Scholars usually refer to these thirteen-day "weeks" as trecenas, using a Spanish term derived from trece "thirteen" (just as the Spanish term docena "dozen" is derived from doce "twelve"). The original Nahuatl term was "in cencalli tonalli" (a family of days), according to Book IV of the Florentine Codex.

Each trecena is named according to the calendar date of the first day of the 13 days in that trecena. In addition, each of the twenty trecenas in the 260-day cycle had its own tutelary deity:

Trecena	Deity	Trecena	Deity
1 Crocodile	Tonacatecuhtli	1 Monkey	Patecatl
1 Jaguar	Quetzalcoatl	1 Lizard	Itztlacoliuhqui
1 Deer	Tepēyōllōtl	1 Quake	Tlazōlteōtl
1 Flower	Huēhuecoyōtl	1 Dog	Xīpe Totēc
1 Reed	Chalchiuhtlicue	1 House	Ītzpāpālōtl
1 Death	Tōnatiuh	1 Vulture	Xolotl
1 Rain	Tlāloc	1 Water	Chalchiuhtotolin
1 Grass	Mayahuel	1 Wind	Chantico
1 Snake	Xiuhtecuhtli	1 Eagle	Xōchiquetzal
1 Flint	Mictlāntēcutli	1 Rabbit	Xiuhtecuhtli

== Xihuitl, Aztec Solar Calendar ==
In ancient times the year was composed of eighteen months, and thus it was observed by the native people. Since their months were made of no more than twenty days, these were all the days contained in a month, because they were not guided by the moon but by the days; therefore, the year had eighteen months. The days of the year were counted twenty by twenty.

— Diego Durán

Xiuhpōhualli is the Aztec year (xihuitl) count (pōhualli). One year consists of 360 named days and 5 nameless (nēmontēmi). These 'extra' days are thought to be unlucky. The year was broken into 18 periods of twenty days each, sometimes compared to the Julian month. The Nahuatl word for moon is metztli but whatever name was used for these periods is unknown. Through Spanish usage, the 20-day period of the Aztec calendar has become commonly known as a veintena.

Each 20-day period started on Cipactli (Crocodile) for which a festival was held. The eighteen veintena are listed below. The dates are from early eyewitnesses; each wrote what they saw. Bernardino de Sahagún's date precedes the observations of Diego Durán by several decades and is before recent to the surrender. Both are shown to emphasize the fact that the beginning of the Native new year became non-uniform as a result of an absence of the unifying force of Tenochtitlan after the Mexica defeat.

=== Veintenas of the xiuhpōhualli ===
#	Glyph	Name	Julian range		Presiding deities
#	Glyph	Name	Durán	Sahagún	Presiding deities
1		ātl cāhualo (“the water ceases”) cuahuitl ēhua (“the trees rise”)	Mar 01–Mar 20	Feb 02–Feb 21	Water gods
2		tlācaxīpēhualiztli (“flaying of men”)	Mar 21–Apr 09	Feb 22–Mar 13	Xipe Totec
3		tōzōztōntli (“lesser vigil”)	Apr 10–Apr 29	Mar 14–Apr 02	Tlaloc
4		huēyi tōzōztli (“greater vigil”)	Apr 30–May 19	Apr 03–Apr 22	Cinteotl
5		toxcatl (“dryness”)	May 20–Jun 08	Apr 23–May 12	Tezcatlipoca
6		etzalcualiztli (“eating of cooked maize and beans”)	Jun 09–Jun 28	May 13–Jun 01	Tlaloque
7		tēcuilhuitōntli (“lesser feast day”)	Jun 29–Jul 18	Jun 02–Jun 21	Huixtocihuatl
8		huēyi tēcuilhuitl (“greater feast day”)	Jul 19–Aug 07	Jun 22–Jul 11	Xilonen
9		tlaxōchimaco (“giving of flowers”) miccāilhuitōntli (“lesser feast day of the dead”)	Aug 08–Aug 27	Jul 12–Jul 31	Huitzilopochtli
10		xocotl huetzi (“the xocotl falls”) huēyi miccāilhuitl (“greater feast day of the dead”)	Aug 28–Sep 16	Aug 01–Aug 20	Xiuhtecuhtli
11		ochpaniztli (“sweeping”)	Sep 17–Oct 06	Aug 21–Sep 09	Teteo Innan
12		teōtlehco (“the gods arrive”)	Oct 07–Oct 26	Sep 10–Sep 29	All the gods
13		tepēilhuitl (“feast day of mountains”)	Oct 27–Nov 15	Sep 30–Oct 19	Mountains
14		quechōlli (“roseate spoonbill”)	Nov 16–Dec 05	Oct 20–Nov 8	Mixcoatl
15		panquetzaliztli (“raising of banners”)	Dec 06–Dec 25	Nov 09–Nov 28	Huitzilopochtli
16		ātemoztli (“descent of water”)	Dec 26–Jan 14	Nov 29–Dec 18	Rain gods
17		tititl (“tightening,” “contraction”)	Jan 15–Feb 03	Dec 19–Jan 07	Tonan
18		izcalli (“offshoot,” “bud”)	Feb 04–Feb 23	Jan 08–Jan 27	Xiuhtecuhtli
–		nēmontēmi (“they fill up in vain”); Not a veintena, 5-day complementary period	Feb 24–Feb 28	Jan 28–Feb 01	None

== Xiuhmolpilli ==
The Mexica counted their years by means of four signs combined with thirteen numbers, thus obtaining periods of 52 years, which are commonly known as Xiuhmolpilli, a popular but incorrect generic name; the most correct Nahuatl word for this cycle is Xiuhnelpilli. The table with the current years:

Tlalpilli Tochtli	Tlalpilli Acatl	Tlalpilli Tecpatl	Tlalpilli Calli
1 tochtli / 1974	1 acatl / 1987	1 tecpatl / 2000	1 calli / 2013
2 acatl / 1975	2 tecpatl / 1988	2 calli / 2001	2 tochtli / 2014
3 tecpatl / 1976	3 calli / 1989	3 tochtli / 2002	3 acatl / 2015
4 calli / 1977	4 tochtli / 1990	4 acatl / 2003	4 tecpatl / 2016
5 tochtli / 1978	5 acatl / 1991	5 tecpatl / 2004	5 calli / 2017
6 acatl / 1979	6 tecpatl / 1992	6 calli / 2005	6 tochtli / 2018
7 tecpatl / 1980	7 calli / 1993	7 tochtli / 2006	7 acatl / 2019
8 calli / 1981	8 tochtli / 1994	8 acatl / 2007	8 tecpatl / 2020
9 tochtli / 1982	9 acatl / 1995	9 tecpatl / 2008	9 calli / 2021
10 acatl / 1983	10 tecpatl / 1996	10 calli / 2009	10 tochtli / 2022
11 tecpatl / 1984	11 calli / 1997	11 tochtli / 2010	11 acatl / 2023
12 calli / 1985	12 tochtli / 1998	12 acatl / 2011	12 tecpatl / 2024
13 tochtli / 1986	13 acatl / 1999	13 tecpatl / 2012	13 calli / 2025

== Reconstruction of the Calendar ==
Today (at UTC+00)
- Sunday, 25 October 2026
- Aztec: Atlcahualo 3, 3 Cōzcacuāuhtli
Other calendars
Akan	Monokwasi
Armenian	7 Trē 1476
Babylonian	12 Tashritu, 2337 SE
Balinese pawukon	Luang, Pepet, Kajeng, Laba, Keliwon, Maulu, Redite of Watugunung, Indra, Gigis, Duka
Bengali	9 Kartik, BS 1433
Chinese	Yang Water Monkey・Emptiness Mansion; Fire Horse Year, Month 9, Day 16 (Shuangjiang, 13 days until Lidong)
Common Era	25 October 2026 CE
Coptic	15 Paopi, AM 1743
Egyptian	12 Phamenoth, 2775 NE
Ethiopian	15 Ṭeqemt, 2019 Amätä Məhrät
French Republican	Décade I, Tridi de Brumaire de l'Année 235 de la République
Gregorian	25 October, AD 2026
Hebrew	14 Cheshvan, AM 5787
Hindu	Revatī・Harṣaṇa; Solar: 8 Kārtika, 1948 SE; Lunisolar: Caturdaśī, Śukla pakṣa of Āśvina, 2083 VE; Rāudra・5127 KY・1,872,873
Icelandic	Sunnudagur, 2 Gormánuður 2026
Islamic	13 Jumada al-awwal, AH 1448 (using tabular method)
ISO week date	2026-W43-7
Japanese	15 Nagatsuki, Reiwa 8 (Sōkō, 13 days until Rittō)
Julian	12 October, AD 2026 (AM 7535)
Julian day	2461339
Korean	15 Gaedal, 4359 DE
Maya	13.0.14.0.16; 9 Zac, 3 Cib
Roman	ante diem IV Idus Octobres, MMDCCLXXIX AUC
Solar Hijri	3 Aban, SH 1405
Tibetan	14 tha skar, me pho rta 2153 or 1772 or 1000

In the last century scholars have made multiple models reconstructing the Calendar.

The Xiuhmachiotl is a contemporary digital reconstruction project that presents multiple Mesoamerican calendrical systems in an integrated interface. Its implementation combines a 260-day Tonalpohualli, a 365-day Xiuhpohualli, a Venus-focused Citlalpohualli, a nine-day Night Lord sequence, lunar and Long Count displays, and additional astronomical visualisation tools. The project distinguishes between reconstructed ceremonial calendar coordinates, arithmetic mean-cycle models, and bounded ephemeris-derived planetary-event data.

Another version was proposed by Professor Rafael Tena of the Instituto Nacional de Antropología e Historia, based on the studies of Sahagún and Alfonso Caso of the National Autonomous University of Mexico. His correlation argues that the first day of the Mexica year was February 13 of the old Julian calendar or February 23 of the current Gregorian calendar. Using the same count, it has been the date of the birth of Huitzilopochtli, the end of the year and a cycle or "Tie of the Years", and the New Fire Ceremony, day-sign 1 Tecpatl of the year 2 Acatl, corresponding to the date February 22. A correlation by independent researcher Ruben Ochoa interprets pre-Columbian codices, to reconstruct the calendar, while ignoring most primary colonial sources that contradict this idea, using a method that proposes to connect the year count to the vernal equinox and placing the first day of the year on the first day after the equinox.

José Genaro Emiliano Medina Ramos, a senior native nahua philosopher from San Lucas Atzala in the state of Puebla, proposes a multidisciplinary calendar reconstruction in náhuatl (‘centro de Puebla’ variant) according with his own nahua cosmosvision; and relying on Ochoa's correlation and on Tena's presuppositions as well. His proposal was translated to Spanish and English, and codified as an academic webpage in 2023.

Unfortunately, both Ochoa and Medina correlations go against strong evidence pointed out by scholars about the Mexica start of day and of the lack of a leap day in all Mesoamerican calendars. In this regard, some Mexican groups such as Kaltonak, are proposing a reconstruction of the calendar based on astronomical, archaeological and historical evidence.

== See also ==
- Aztec New Year
- Maya calendar
- Mesoamerican calendars
- Muisca calendar
