= Teotleco =

Twelfth veintena of the xiuhpōhualli

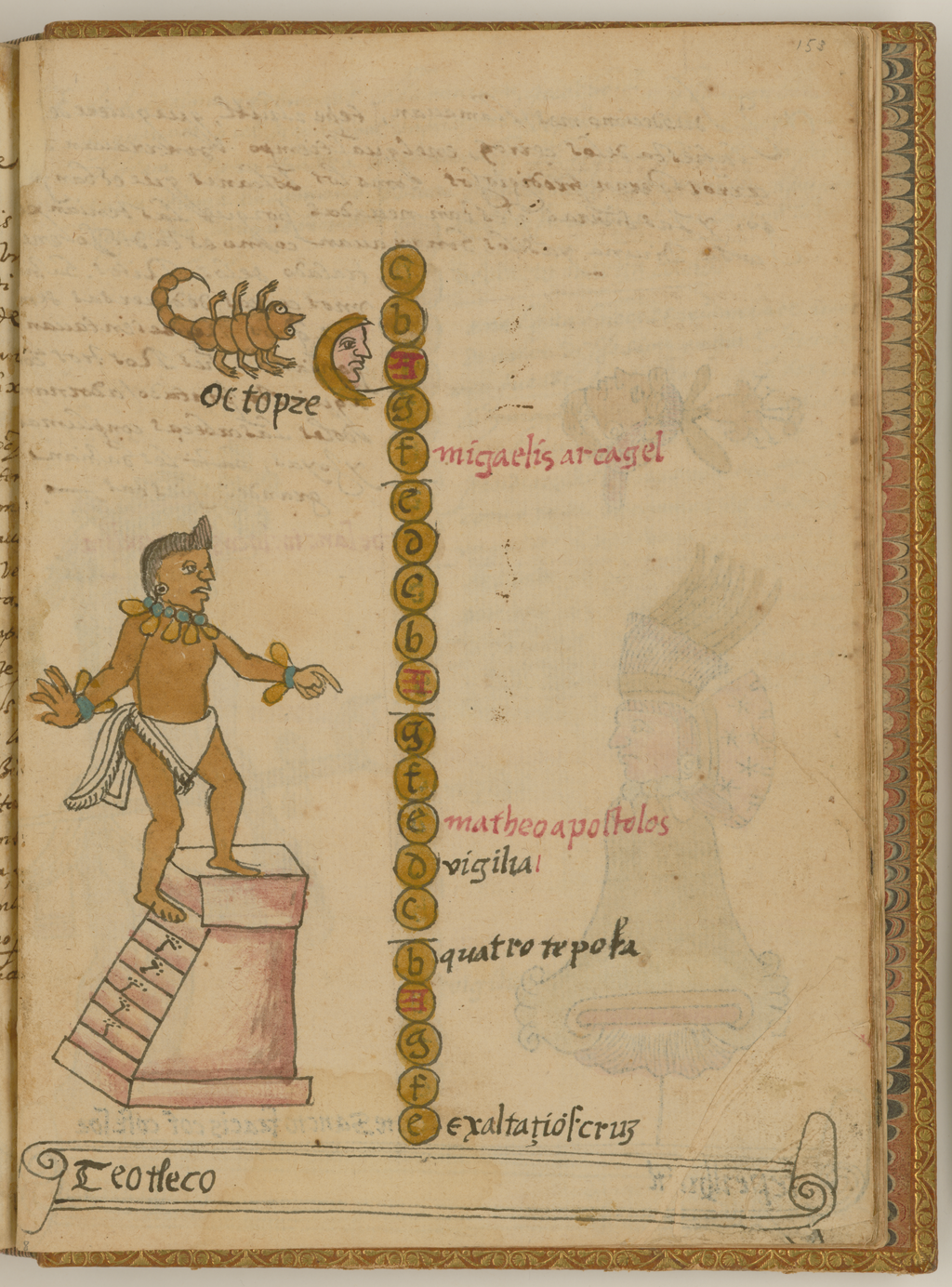
Teotleco as depicted in the Tovar Codex

Teotleco is the name of the twelfth month of the Aztec calendar. It is also a festival in the Aztec religion and is known as the festival of All gods where all gods are worshiped. Sometimes it was referred to as Pachtontli ("small hay"), Pachtli "hay", or Ecoztli.
