= Tecuilhuitontli =

Seventh veintena of the xiuhpōhualli

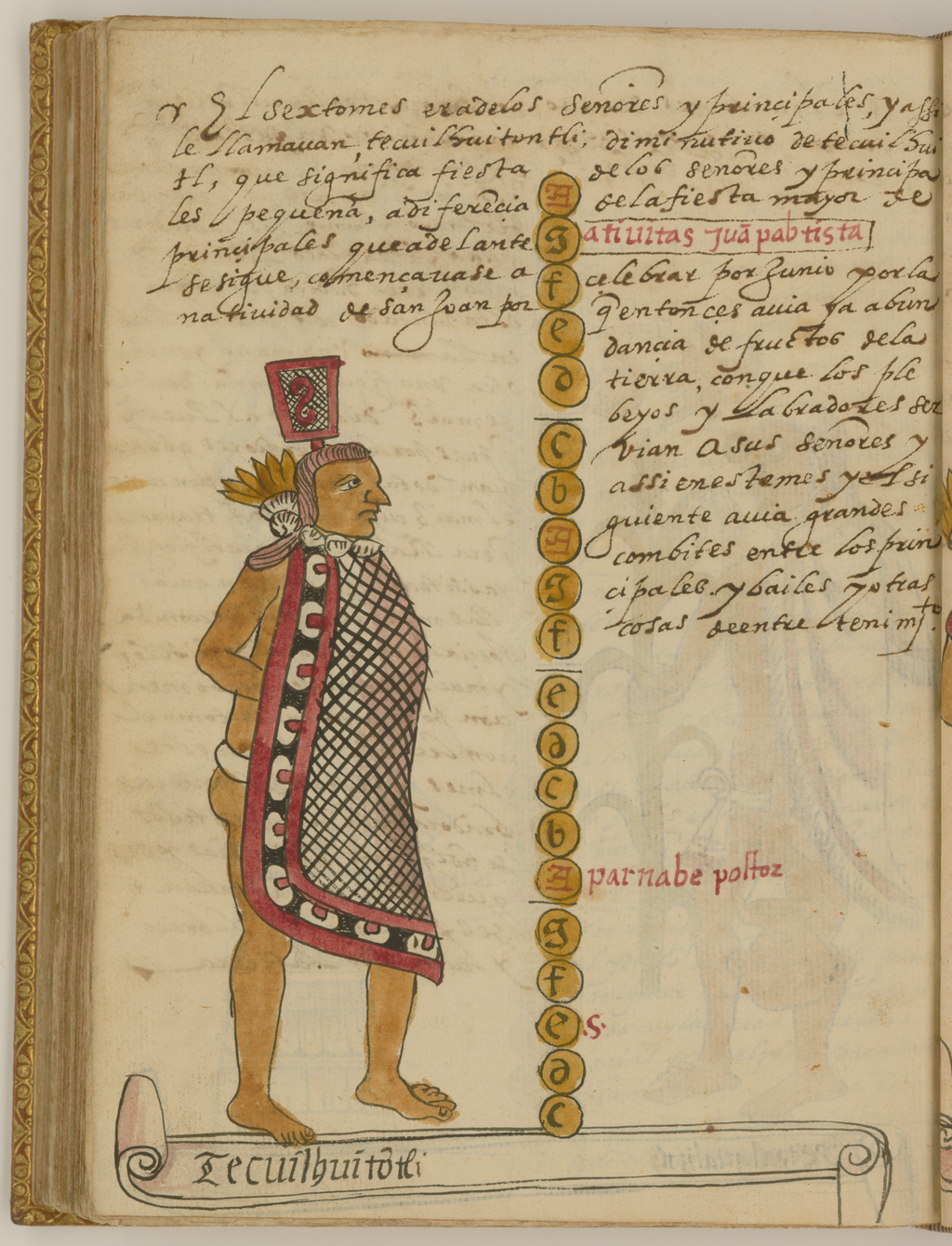
Tecuilhuitontli as depicted in the Tovar Codex

Tecuilhuitontli is the name of the Seventh month of the Aztec calendar. It is also a festival in the Aztec religion. The principal deity is Xochipilli and feasts are also given to Goddess Huixtocihuatl and it is known as the Small Festival of the Lords.
