= Vikram Samvat =

Hindu calendar

Today (at UTC+00)
- Thursday, 19 November 2026
- Hindu: Pūrvabhādrapada・Vyāghāta; Solar: 3 Mārgaśīrṣa, 1948 SE; Lunisolar: Daśamī, Śukla pakṣa of Kārtika, 2083 VE; Rāudra・5127 KY・1,872,898
Other calendars
Akan	Foyaw
Armenian	2 Kʿaloch 1476
Aztec	Tlacaxipehualiztli 8, 2 Cipactli
Babylonian	8 Arakhsamna, 2337 SE
Balinese pawukon	Menga, Pasah, Jaya, Keliwon, Tungleh, Wraspati of Ukir, Guru, Urungan, Manusa
Bengali	4 Ogrohayon, BS 1433
Chinese	Yin Fire Rooster・Dipper Mansion; Fire Horse Year, Month 10, Day 11 (Lidong, 3 days until Xiaoxue)
Common Era	19 November 2026 CE
Coptic	10 Hathor, AM 1743
Egyptian	7 Pharmuthi, 2775 NE
Ethiopian	10 H̱edār, 2019 Amätä Məhrät
French Republican	Décade III, Octidi de Brumaire de l'Année 235 de la République
Gregorian	19 November, AD 2026
Hebrew	9 Kislev, AM 5787
Icelandic	Fimmtudagur, 27 Gormánuður 2026
Islamic	8 Jumada al-thani, AH 1448 (using tabular method)
ISO week date	2026-W47-4
Japanese	11 Kannazuki, Reiwa 8 (Rittō, 3 days until Shōsetsu)
Julian	6 November, AD 2026 (AM 7535)
Julian day	2461364
Korean	11 Dwaejidal, 4359 DE
Maya	13.0.14.2.1; 14 Ceh, 2 Imix
Roman	ante diem VIII Idus Novembres, MMDCCLXXIX AUC
Solar Hijri	28 Aban, SH 1405
Tibetan	10 smin drug, me pho rta 2153 or 1772 or 1000

Vikram Samvat (IAST: Vikrama Saṁvat; abbr. VS; Sanskrit: विक्रम संवत्) known as the Vikrami or Bikrami calendar, is a Hindu calendar historically used in the Indian subcontinent and still used in several Indian states and Nepal. It is a lunisolar calendar, using twelve lunar months and an intercalary month each sidereal year. The epoch of the Vikram Samvat calendar is the full moon or new moon of March or April (varies by culture), 57 BCE, so the year count of Vikram Samvat is usually 57 years ahead of the Gregorian calendar, except during the period from January to March/April, when it is ahead by 56 years.

Vikram Samvat is an official calendar of Nepal, where the first month is Vaishakha and the last month is Chaitra. Unlike India, where it is used only for religious dates (with the first month starting with Chaitra), in Nepal the solar version of Vikram Samvat is a civil calendar for general usage.

== History ==
A number of ancient and medieval inscriptions used the Vikram Samvat. Although it was reportedly named after the legendary king Vikramaditya (Chandragupta II), the term "Vikrama Samvat" does not appear in the historical record before the 9th century; the same calendar system is found with other names, such as Krita and Malava. In colonial scholarship, the era was believed to be based on the commemoration of King Vikramaditya expelling the Sakas from Ujjain. However, later epigraphical evidence and scholarship suggest that this theory has no historical basis. During the 9th century, epigraphical artwork began using Vikram Samvat (suggesting that the Hindu calendar era in use became popular as Vikram Samvat); Buddhist and Jain epigraphy continued to use an era based on the Buddha or the Mahavira.

=== Kalakacharya Kathanaka and the origin ===
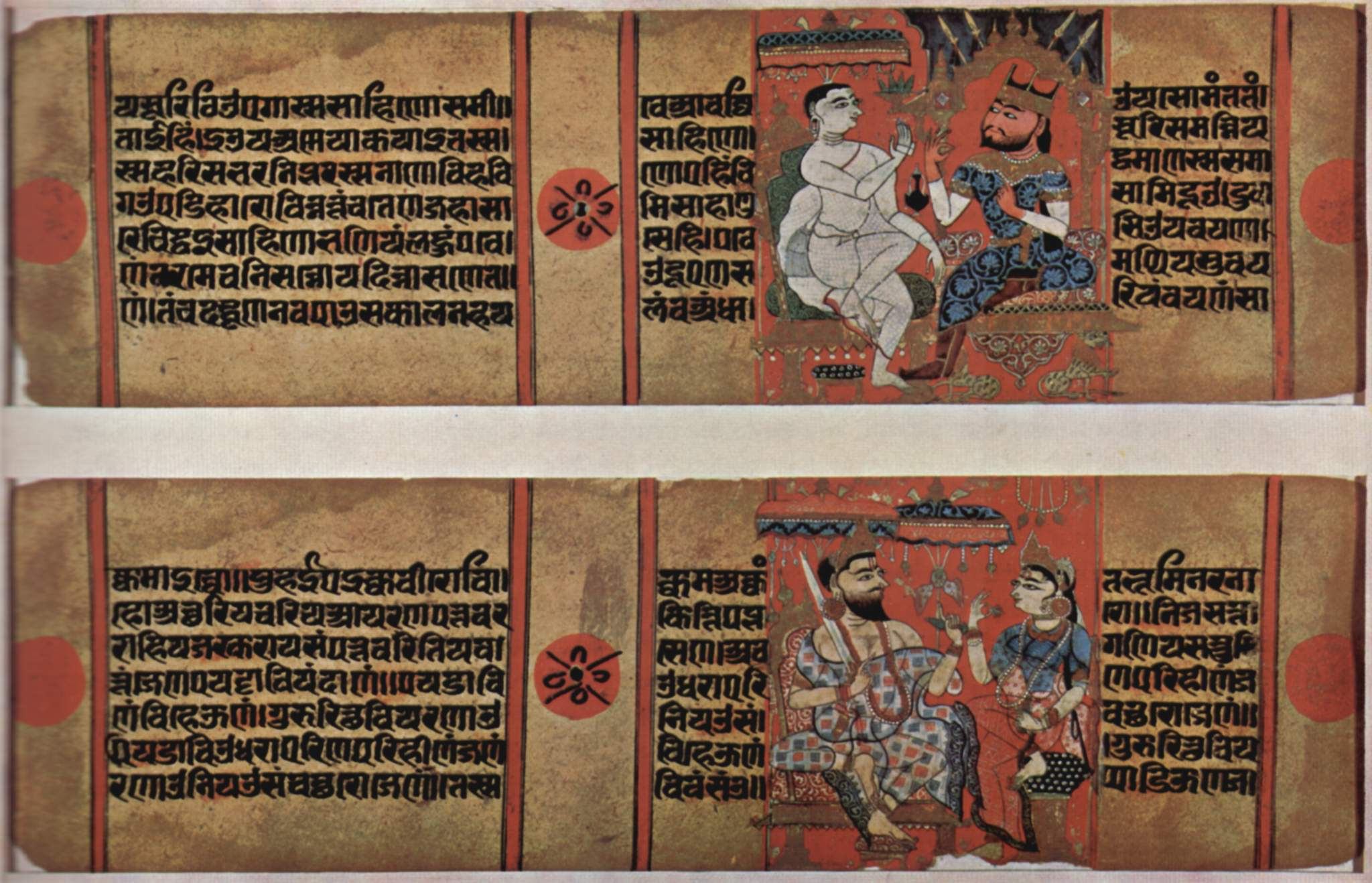
The Jain monk Kalakacharya and the Saka king (Kalakacharya Katha manuscript, Chhatrapati Shivaji Maharaj Vastu Sangrahalaya, Mumbai)

According to popular tradition, King Vikramaditya of Ujjain established the Vikrama Samvat era after defeating the Śakas.

Kalakacharya Kathanaka (An account of the monk Kalakacharya), by the Jain sage Mahesarasuri, gives the following account: Gandharvasena, the then-powerful king of Ujjain, abducted a nun called Sarasvati, who was the sister of the monk. The enraged monk sought the help of the Śaka ruler, King Sahi in Sistan. Despite heavy odds but aided by miracles, the Śaka king defeated Gandharvasena and made him a captive. Sarasvati was repatriated, although Gandharvasena himself was forgiven. The defeated king retired to the forest, where he was killed by a tiger. His son, Vikramaditya, being brought up in the forest, had to rule from Pratishthana (modern Paithan in Maharashtra). Later on, Vikramaditya invaded Ujjain and drove away the Śakas. To commemorate this event, he started a new era called the "Vikrama era". The Ujjain calendar started around 58–56 BCE, and the subsequent Shaka-era calendar was started in 78 CE at Pratishthana.

=== Origins and historical development ===
The calendar era beginning in 57 BCE was originally known by other names, including "Kṛṭa" (343 and 371 CE), "Kritaa" (404), "the era of the Malava tribe" (424), or simply "Samvat", before it was later renamed and associated with King Vikramaditya starting in the 9th century CE. The earliest known inscription which calls the era "Vikrama" is from 842. This inscription, from the Chauhana ruler Chandamahasena, was found at Dholpur and is dated "Vikrama Samvat 898, Vaishakha Shukla 2, Chanda" (20 April 842). The earliest known inscription which associates the era with a king called Vikramaditya is dated 971, and the earliest literary work connecting the era to Vikramaditya is Subhashita-Ratna-Sandoha (993–994) by the Jain author Amitagati.

A number of authors believe that the Vikram Samvat was not started by Vikramaditya, who might be a legendary king or a title adopted by a later king who renamed the era after himself. V. A. Smith and D. R. Bhandarkar believed that Chandragupta II adopted the title of Vikramaditya, and changed the era's name to "Vikrama Samvat". According to Rudolf Hoernlé, the king responsible for this change was Yashodharman. Hoernlé believed that he conquered Kashmir and is the "Harsha Vikramaditya" mentioned in Kalhana's Rajatarangini.

Some earlier scholars believed that the Vikram Samvat corresponded to the Azes era of the Indo-Scythian (Śaka) king King Azes. This was disputed by Robert Bracey after the discovery of an inscription of Vijayamitra, which is dated in two eras. The theory was discredited by Falk and Bennett, who place the inception of the Azes era in 47–46 BCE.

== Usage and regional significance ==
The Vikram Samvat has been used by Hindus, Sikhs, and Pashtuns. One of several regional Hindu calendars in use on the Indian subcontinent, it is based on twelve synodic lunar months and 365 solar days. The lunar year in India begins with the new moon of the month of Chaitra.

The calendar remains in use by people in Nepal serving as its national calendar where the first month is Baisakh and the last month is Chaitra. It is also symbolically used by Hindus of north, west and central India. Alongside Nepal Sambat, Bikram Sambat is one of two official calendars used in Nepal. In south India and portions of east and west India (such as Assam, West Bengal and Gujarat), the Indian national calendar is widely used.

With the arrival of Islamic rule, the Hijri calendar became the official calendar of sultanates and the Mughal Empire. During British colonial rule of the Indian subcontinent, the Gregorian calendar was adopted and is commonly used in urban areas of India. The predominantly-Muslim countries of Pakistan and Bangladesh have used the Islamic calendar since 1947, but older texts included the Vikram Samvat and Gregorian calendars. In 2003, the India-based Sikh Shiromani Gurdwara Parbandhak Committee controversially adopted the Nanakshahi calendar.

== Calendar system ==
Like the Hebrew and Chinese calendars, the Vikram Samvat is lunisolar. In common years, the lunar year is 354 days long, while a leap lunar month (adhika māsa) is added roughly in accordance to the Metonic cycle, namely, 7 times every 19 years, to ensure that festivals and crop-related rituals fall in the appropriate season. Early Buddhist communities in India adopted the ancient Hindu calendar, followed by the Vikram Samvat and local Buddhist calendars. Buddhist festivals are still scheduled according to a lunar system.

The Vikram Samvat has two systems. It began in 56 BCE in the southern Hindu calendar system (amaanta) and 57–56 BCE in the northern system (purnimaanta). The Shukla Paksha, when most festivals occur, coincides in both systems. The lunisolar Vikram Samvat calendar is 56.7 years ahead of the solar Gregorian calendar; the year 2083 VS (amaanta) begins on 19 March 2026 and will include an adhika māsa (extra lunar month), making the lunar year 13 months long. The solar Bikram Sambat used in Nepal begins in mid-April 2026 CE.

=== New Year ===
- Chaitra Navaratri: the second most celebrated, named after vasanta which means spring. It is observed in the lunar month of Chaitra (post-winter, March–April). In many regions the festival falls after spring harvest, and in others during harvest. It also marks the first day of the Hindu calendar, hence also known as the Hindu Lunar New Year according to Vikram Samvat calendar.
- Vaisakhi:
  - Vaisakhi marks the beginning of Hindu Solar New Year in Punjab, Northern, Eastern, North-eastern and Central India according to the solar Vikram Samvat calendar. and marks the first day of the month of Vaisakha, which is usually celebrated on 13 or 14 April every year and is a historical and religious festival in Hinduism.
  - Baisakh (Nepal): The first day of Baisakh is celebrated as Nepalese New Year because it is the day which marks Hindu Solar New Year as per the solar Nepali Bikram Sambat.
- Varsha Pratipada or Bestu Varas: It is considered an auspicious day celebrated in the Indian state of Gujarat to mark the New Year according to the Vikram Samvat Hindu calendar. It falls on the first day of the bright fortnight of the month of Kartika. The day is significant as it symbolizes the beginning of the agricultural year, and farmers traditionally start their new accounting books on this day.

== Divisions of a year ==
The Vikram Samvat uses lunar months and sidereal years. Because 12 months do not match a sidereal year, correctional months (adhika māsa) are added or (occasionally) subtracted (kshaya masa). A lunar year consists of 12 months, and each month has two fortnights, with a variable duration ranging from 29 to 32 days. The lunar days are called tithis. Each month has 30 tithis, which vary in length from 20 to 27 hours. The waxing phase, beginning with the day after the new moon (amavasya), is called gaura or shukla paksha (the bright or auspicious fortnight). The waning phase is called krishna or vadhya paksha (the dark fortnight, considered inauspicious).

=== Lunar metrics ===
- A tithi is the time it takes for the longitudinal angle between the Moon and the Sun to increase by 12°. Tithis begin at various times of the day, and vary in duration. - A paksha (or pakṣa) is a lunar fortnight and consists of 15 tithis. - A māsa, or lunar month (about 29.5 days), is divided into two paksas. - A ritu (season) is two māsas. - An ayana is three ritus. - A year is two ayanas.

=== Months ===
The classical Vikram Samvat is generally 57 years ahead of Gregorian Calendar, except during January to March/April, when it is ahead by 56 years. The month that the new year starts varies by region or sub-culture.

The names of months in the Vikram Samvat in Sanskrit and Nepali, with their roughly corresponding Gregorian months, respectively are:

S.No	Vikram Samvat months	Gregorian months	Days
1	Vaiśākha or Baisakh	April–May	30/31
2	Jyēṣṭha or Jestha or Jeth	May–June	31/32
3	Āṣāḍha or Asar or Asadh	June–July	31/32
4	Śrāvaṇa or Saaun or Shrawan	July–August	31/32
5	Bhādrapada or Bhādra or Bhadau	August–September	30/31/32
6	Āśvin or Aasoj or Ashwin	September–October	30/31
7	Kārtika or Kattik or Kartik	October–November	29/30
8	Agrahāyaṇa or Mangsir or Mārgaśīrṣa or Aghan	November–December	29/30
9	Pauṣa or Paush or Poush or Push	December–January	29/30
10	Māgha or Maagh	January–February	29/30
11	Phālguna or Falgun	February–March	29/30
12	Caitra or Chait or Chaitra	March–April	30/31

== Abbreviations ==
Whilst the calendar notation is commonly abbreviated as V.S. ("Vikram Samvat"), another alternative abbreviation is Bk. ("Bikrami") or simply as S. ("Sammat"). The Bk. abbreviation is often used by Punjabis.

== Present situation ==
The Rana dynasty of Nepal made the Vikram Samvat the official Hindu calendar in 1901 CE, which began as 1958 VS. The new year in Nepal begins with the first day of the month of Baisakh, which usually falls around 13–15 April in the Gregorian calendar and ends with the last day of the month Chaitra. The first day of the new year is a public holiday in Nepal. Bisket Jatra, an annual carnival in Bhaktapur, is also celebrated on Baishakh 1. In 2007, Nepal Sambat was also recognised as a national calendar alongside Vikram Samvat.

In India, the reformulated Saka calendar is officially used (except for computing dates of the traditional festivals). In the Hindi version of the preamble of the constitution of India, the date of its adoption (26 November 1949) is presented in Vikram Samvat as Margsheersh Shukla Saptami Samvat 2006. A call has been made for the Vikram Samvat to replace the Saka calendar as India's official calendar.

== See also ==
- Saka era - Hindu units of time - Hindu calendar - Vira Nirvana Samvat

- Muhurtam
- Vikramaditya
- Chandragupta II
