= Shiyue (month) =

Tenth month of the Chinese calendar

Shíyuè

Chinese name
- Chinese: 十月
- Hanyu Pinyin: Shíyuè
Transcriptions
Standard Mandarin
- Hanyu Pinyin: Shíyuè

Korean name
- Hangul: 시월
- Hanja: 十月
Transcriptions
- Revised Romanization: Siwol

Traditional Korean name
- Hangul: 돼지달
- Hanja: 亥月
Transcriptions
- Revised Romanization: Dwaejidal

Japanese name
- Kanji: 十月
- Kana: じゅうがつ
Transcriptions
- Romanization: Jūgatsu

Traditional Japanese name
- Kanji: 神無月
- Kana: かんなづき
Transcriptions
- Romanization: Kannazuki

Shíyuè (Chinese: 十月) is the tenth month of the Chinese calendar and calendars based on it, such as the Japanese calendar, Korean calendar and Vietnamese calendar. It follows Jiǔyuè and precedes Shíyīyuè. It is known in Japanese as Jūgatsu (Japanese: 十月) or traditionally Kannazuki (Japanese: 神無月), and in Korean as Siwol (Korean: 시월; Hanja: 十月) or traditionally Dwaejidal (Korean: 돼지달; Hanja: 亥月). All of these words can also refer to the month of October in the Gregorian calendar.

== Names ==
In Mandarin Chinese, traditional names of the month include liángyuè (Chinese: 良月), yángyuè (Chinese: 陽月／阳月), and mèngdōng (Chinese: 孟冬).

In Japanese, the month is known as jūgatsu (Japanese: 十月) or traditionally kannazuki (Japanese: 神無月). The character 無, which normally means "absent" or "not exist", was used in 神無月 only as an ateji for a possessive particle, giving the sense "month of the gods". However, by false etymology, 神無月 was interpreted to mean "month of no gods", which gave rise to the belief that all the deities in Japan leave their local shrines to assemble at Izumo-taisha during this month. Thus, in Izumo, the month is instead called kamiarizuki (Japanese: 神在月; "month when the gods are present").

Another traditional Korean name for the month is sangdal (Korean: 상달; Hanja: 上月). In Korea, it is traditionally regarded as the most sacred month of the year.

== Observances ==
- The Hanyi Festival is held on the 1st day of the 10th month.
- Tōkan'ya (Japanese: 十日夜), a harvest celebration in eastern Japan, is held on the 10th day of the 10th month.
- At Izumo-taisha, the deities are ceremonially welcomed on the evening of the 10th day of the 10th month, and the Kamiari rites run from the 11th to the 17th day.
- The Xia Yuan Festival is held on the fifteenth day of the tenth month.

== Dates ==
Below is a list of the start and end dates of Shíyuè in the Gregorian calendar. Because the 1-hour difference between China and Japan/Korea occasionally affects the date on which a new moon occurs, the dates below can differ from those of the Japanese and Korean calendars.

Dates of Shíyuè
Year	First day	Last day
2016	31 October	28 November
2017	18 November	17 December
2018	8 November	6 December
2019	28 October	25 November
2020	15 November	14 December
2021	5 November	3 December
2022	25 October	23 November
2023	13 November	12 December
2024	1 November	30 November
2025	20 November	19 December
2026	9 November	8 December
2027	29 October	27 November
2028	16 November	15 December
2029	6 November	4 December
2030	27 October	24 November
2031	15 November	13 December
2032	3 November	2 December
2033	23 October	21 November
2034	11 November	10 December
2035	31 October	29 November
2036	18 November	16 December
