= Caimo =

Caimo is an Italian surname. Notable people with the surname include:

- Angelo Caimo (1914–1998), Italian footballer
- Gioseppe Caimo (c. 1545–1584), Italian Renaissance composer and organist
