= New Fire ceremony =

Aztec religious ceremony of renewal held every 52 years

The New Fire Ceremony (Classical Nahuatl: Toxiuhmilpilia, Spanish: Ceremonia del Fuego Nuevo) was an Aztec ceremony performed once every 52 years—a full cycle of the Aztec “calendar round”—in order to stave off the end of the world. The calendar round was the combination of the 260-day ritual calendar and the 365-day annual calendar. The New Fire Ceremony was part of the “Binding of the Years” tradition among the Aztecs.

The Binding of the Years occurred every 52 years (called xiuhmolpilli), or every 18,980 days as a part of the combination of the two calendars. Arithmetically, the duration of the Calendar Round is the least common multiple of 260 and 365; 18,980 is 73 × 260 Tzolkʼin days and 52 × 365 Haabʼ days derived from the Maya calendar. During this time the Aztecs believed the sun might not come back. The Aztecs wanted to symbolically and literally purify and "renew" their lives for the beginning of the new 52 year cycle. Therefore, many items such as hearth stones were thrown out in order to not be associated with the old cycle in any way. They used this time as a "spring cleaning" to honor the old and prepare for the new. It was the fire that acted as this Binding of the Years.

The ceremony itself entailed all the fires being put out. Then, in Uixachtlan they started a fire on the chest of a captive and cut out his heart to place it in to fuel the fire. The fire then was taken all over the city to celebrate because the sun would return. People would cut their ears and put their blood in the fire. Thus the New Fire Ceremony started the new cycle and ensured the sun would return each day for another 18,980 days.

The New Fire ceremonies were not limited to the Aztecs. In fact it was an ancient and widespread ritual in Postclassic Central Mexico that the Aztecs appropriated to their own society. The Anales de Tlatelolco mention the Aztecs upon achieving independence of the Tepanec state celebrated a New Fire ceremony that marked the beginning of the calendric count of the Aztecs. This suggests that the ceremony was also used as a dynastic foundation rite.

== Details of the ceremony ==
The Aztec glyph for a New Fire ceremony, with the year Two Reed (Ome Acatl).

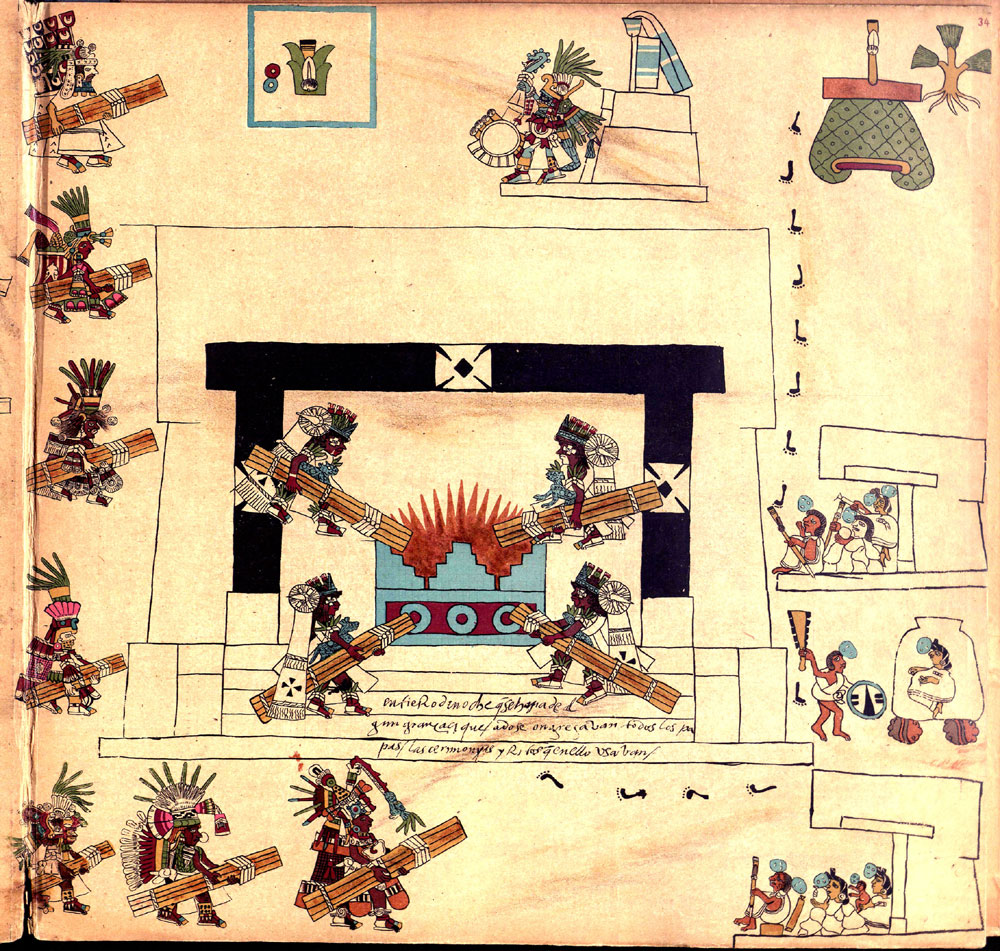
Representation of a new fire ceremony (Codex Borbonicus, p.34).

The Celebration of the New Fire ceremony is described by Tovar. During the last five days (called nemontemi) of the last year of the cycle, the preparations for the ceremony began. These preparations involved abstinence from work, fasting, ritual cleansing, ritual bloodletting, destruction of old household items and observance of silence. It was believed that during these days the world was in grave danger because of the instability inherent in the shift from one cycle to another. It was feared that female stellar deities, the Tzitzimime, would descend and devour the earth.

In the days prior to the New Fire Ceremony, citizens would renew their houses and ready them for the ceremony by throwing out hearth stones, clothes, jars and other vessels for cooking, idols and other household goods. These things were considered to hold essences that would be linked to the old cycle. On a national level, temples were also expanded and changed in the spirit of renewal. The ceremony was represented as a bundle of sticks when it was carved as the ceremony was thought to reset the cycle of the years.

At sunset on the last day of the year, which always happened during the birth of Huitzilopochtli, the day-sign "1 Tecpatl" of the year "2 Acatl," a procession of priests from the fire cult of Huehueteotl walked from the ceremonial center of Tenochtitlan across the eastbound causeway towards a mountain called Huixachtlan on the eastern bank of Lake Texcoco close to Colhuacan. The priests would dress as various deities to perform the ceremony. The summit of Huizachtlan was visible from most of the Basin of Mexico. On this extinct volcano was a temple platform. At this time all fires in the Aztec realm were put out and everyone looked toward the mountain's summit. When the constellation called by the Aztecs "the fire drill" (Orion's Belt) rose above the horizon, a man was sacrificed on the top of Huizachtlan and a fire drill was placed on his chest. When the priest started the fire he started it on the sacrifice's chest and then as soon as it caught he would slice the man's chest open and taken out his heart to fuel the fire. This new fire that was started in the first sacrifice's chest started off the ceremony and then later numerous sacrifices celebrated the new cycle. When the first sparks of fire sprung from the fire drill, the New Calendar Round was declared begun and a huge bonfire was lit. From this bonfire torches were carried by runners to every ward of the city where the temple hearths would be lit. The first fires to be lit in this way were those at the twin temple Templo Mayor where the Tlatoani would participate, and later the fires at the Calmecac of Huitzilopochtli and subsequently the lesser temples and Calmecacs and Telpochcallis and lastly private households.

Once the fires in homes were lit, people celebrated the renewal by cutting their ears and the ears of their children and throwing blood towards the first fire. People would also often throw themselves into the fire to sacrifice or blister themselves; among this, there would be great celebrating and no one would sleep all throughout the night.

== Astrology in The Binding of the Years ==
The Aztecs believed that their ability to continue in the world as they knew it relied on their ability to understand and incorporate astrological signs and patterns into their own festivals and seasons.

The Templo Mayor, which was the temple in the Aztec capital Tenochtitlan, was largely important to the New Fire Ceremony because there the ceremonial fire was taken to the top of the pyramid and lit inside the Temple of Huitzilopochtli. The position of every part of the ceremony was carefully chosen to either mirror what was happening in the sky or to please the gods or both. When the priest would wait for the constellation to move, that was the signal that all would be well and that is when he would start the fire on the sacrifice's chest. This ritual sacrifice took place on Huixachtlan which was a large, ceremonially important mountain and the first temple to receive fire from the new fire. Both of these places show that the New Fire Ceremony was closely tied to their understanding of astrology and their gods.

The Binding of the Years refers to what was originally thought to be a Teotihuacan idea of the end of a calendrical cycle. It also might have come from another previous civilization. For 52 years, or 18,980 days, the earth was on one cycle and then at the end of that cycle it was thought to be in danger of ending if a new cycle did not begin. This ceremony's success determined whether the next cycle would begin or if everything would end as we know it.

== Archaeology ==
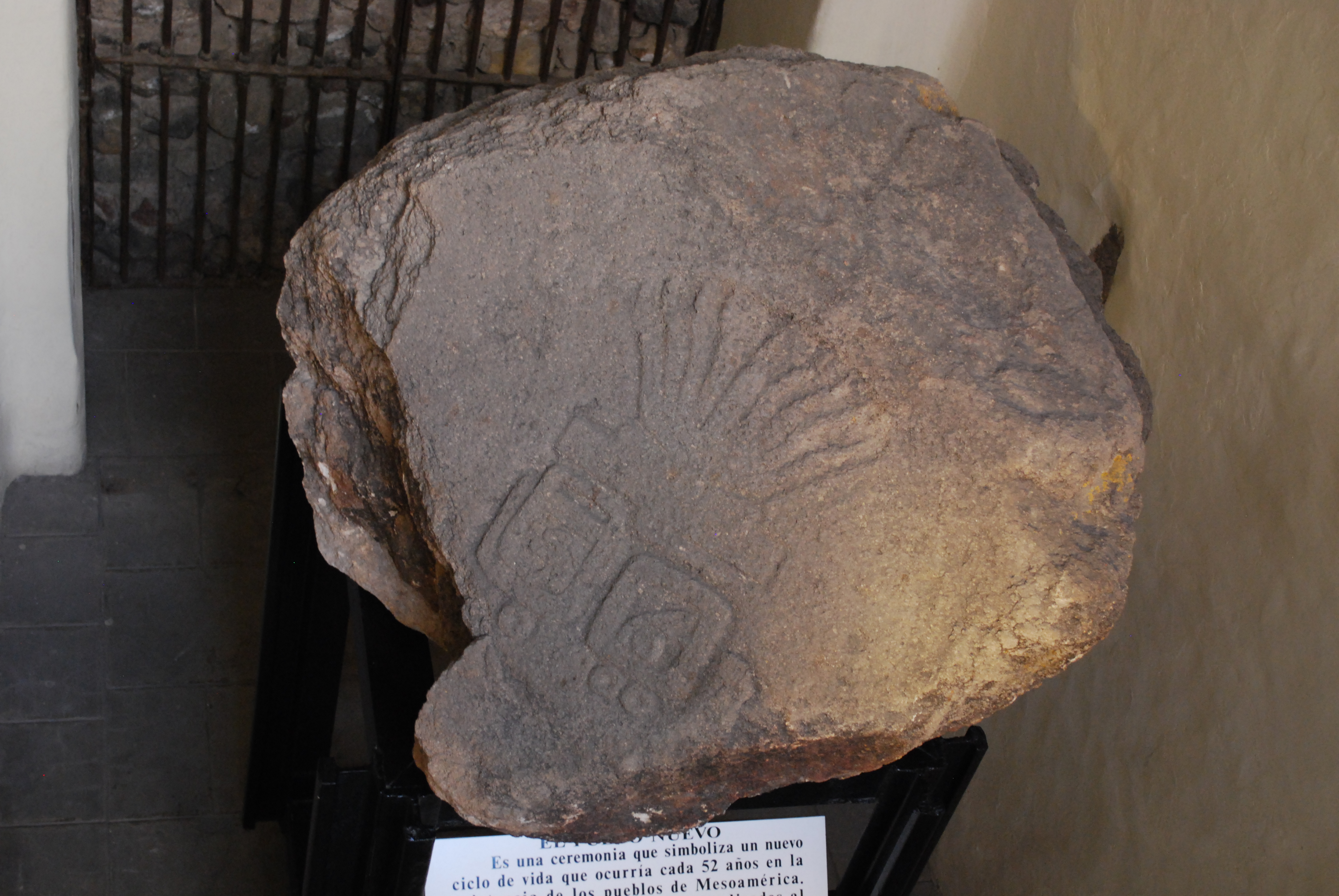
Stone etched with the symbol of the "new fire" or beginning of the 52-year cycle on the Aztec calendar. It is also inscribed with the dates 1 rabbit and 2 serpent. On display at the Palace of Cortes, Cuernavaca, Mexico

It has been proposed that archaeological evidence of New Fire ceremonies can be found in the shape of dumps of pottery and households utensils discarded in the initial stage of the celebration. The idea was first proposed by George C. Vaillant in the 1930s but his model was criticized as theoretically unfounded and abandoned. In 2001, Elson and Smith rethought the proposal in light of the findings of several ceramic dumps that seemed to match the idea of what remains of New Fire ceremony would look like. They conclude that New Fire ceremonies were held throughout the Aztec sphere of influence and had a distinct importance at both the local level of each household and in the larger political level of the state religion.

== See also ==
- Aztec calendar
- Aztec religion
