= Jiuyue =

Ninth month of the Chinese calendar

Jiǔyuè

Chinese name
- Chinese: 九月
- Hanyu Pinyin: Jiǔyuè
Transcriptions
Standard Mandarin
- Hanyu Pinyin: Jiǔyuè

Korean name
- Hangul: 구월
- Hanja: 九月
Transcriptions
- Revised Romanization: Guwol

Traditional Korean name
- Hangul: 개달
- Hanja: 戌月
Transcriptions
- Revised Romanization: Gaedal

Japanese name
- Kanji: 九月
- Kana: くがつ
Transcriptions
- Romanization: Kugatsu

Traditional Japanese name
- Kanji: 長月
- Kana: ながつき
Transcriptions
- Romanization: Nagatsuki

Jiǔyuè (Chinese: 九月) is the ninth month of the Chinese calendar and calendars based on it, such as the Japanese calendar, Korean calendar and Vietnamese calendar. It follows Bāyuè and precedes Shíyuè. It is known in Japanese as Kugatsu (Japanese: 九月) or traditionally Nagatsuki (Japanese: 長月), and in Korean as Guwol (Korean: 구월; Hanja: 九月) or traditionally Gaedal (Korean: 개달; Hanja: 戌月). All of these words can also refer to the month of September in the Gregorian calendar.

== Names ==
In Mandarin Chinese, traditional names of the month include júyuè (Chinese: 菊月), xuányuè (Chinese: 玄月), and jìqiū (Chinese: 季秋).

In Japanese, the month is known as kugatsu (Japanese: 九月) or traditionally nagatsuki (Japanese: 長月). The most common etymology of nagatsuki derives it from yonagazuki (Japanese: 夜長月; "month of long nights"), in reference to the lengthening nights. Alternative Japanese names include kishū (Japanese: 季秋), kikuzuki (Japanese: 菊月), momijizuki (Japanese: 紅葉月), kizomezuki (Japanese: 木染月), bueki (Japanese: 無射), and gengetsu (Japanese: 玄月).

== Observances ==
- The Double Ninth Festival (called Jungyangjeol in Korea and Chōyō in Japan) is held on the 9th day of the 9th month.
- Kannamesai was held on the 17th day of the 9th month before Japan adopted the Gregorian calendar.

== Dates ==
Below is a list of the start and end dates of Jiǔyuè in the Gregorian calendar. Because the 1-hour difference between China and Japan/Korea occasionally affects the date on which a new moon occurs, the dates below can differ from those of the Japanese and Korean calendars.

Dates of Jiǔyuè
Year	First day	Last day
2016	1 October	30 October
2017	20 October	17 November
2018	9 October	7 November
2019	29 September	27 October
2020	17 October	14 November
2021	6 October	4 November
2022	26 September	24 October
2023	15 October	12 November
2024	3 October	31 October
2025	21 October	19 November
2026	10 October	8 November
2027	30 September	28 October
2028	18 October	15 November
2029	8 October	5 November
2030	27 September	26 October
2031	16 October	14 November
2032	4 October	2 November
2033	23 September	22 October
2034	12 October	10 November
2035	1 October	30 October
2036	19 October	17 November
