= Huixtocihuatl =

Aztec goddess

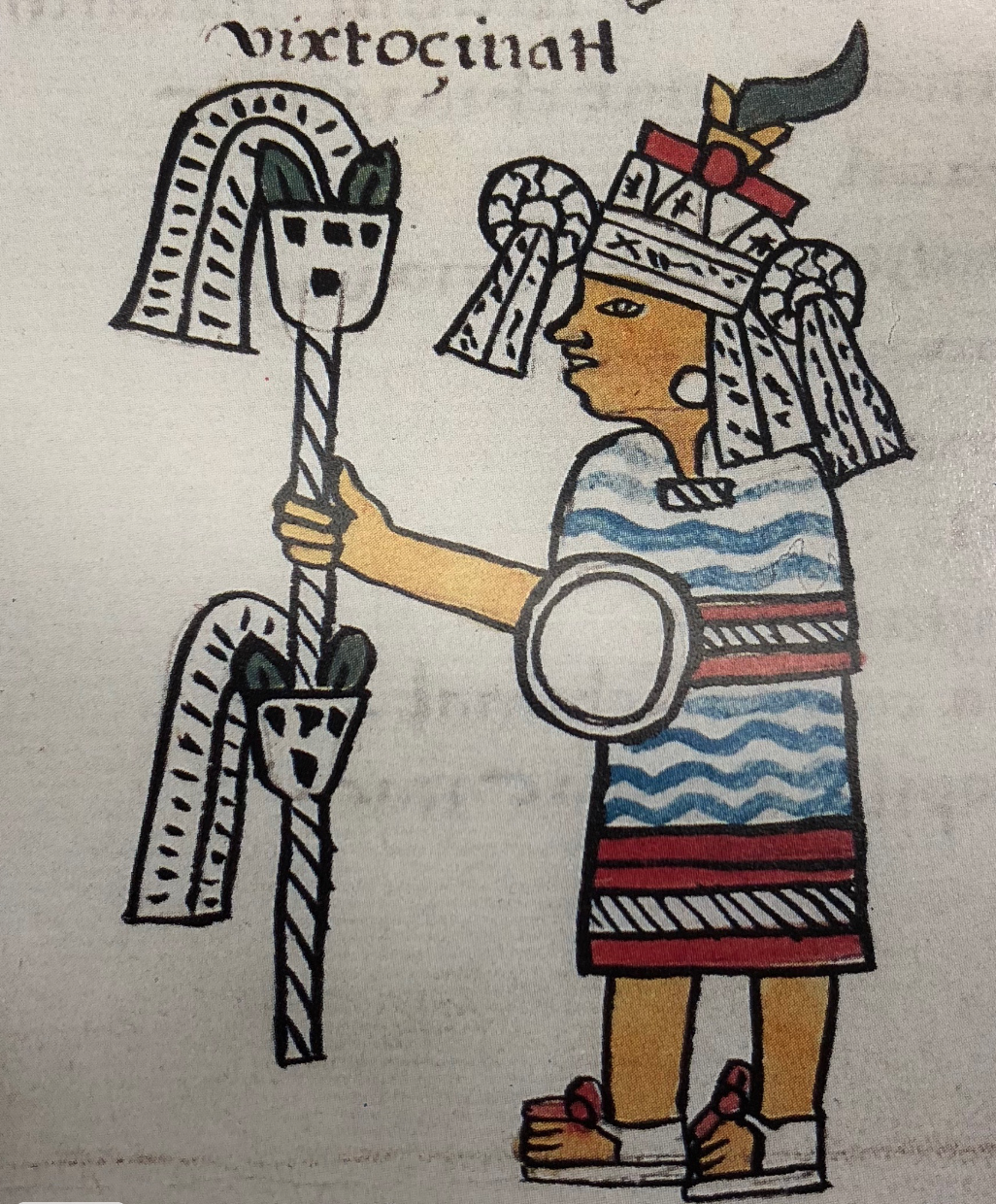
- Depiction of Huixtocihuatl from Bernardino de Sahagun's Primeros Memoriales, which was published in 1590 (fol. 264r). She holds a reed staff in her hand and wears garments with a water design.
- Gender: female

In Aztec religion, Huixtocihuatl (Nahuatl pronunciation: [wiʃtoˈsiwaːt͡ɬ]; or Uixtochihuatl, Uixtociuatl) was a fertility goddess who presided over salt and salt water. The Aztecs considered her to be the older sister of the rain gods, including Tlaloc in most sources. Much of the information known about Huixtocihuatl and how the Aztecs celebrated her comes from Bernardino de Sahagún's manuscripts. His Florentine Codex explains how Huixtocihuatl became the salt god. It records that Huixtocihuatl angered her younger brothers, the Tlaloques, by mocking them, so they banished her to the salt beds. It was there where she discovered salt and how it was created. As described in the second book of the Florentine Codex, during Tecuilhuitontli, the seventh month of the Aztec calendar, there was a festival in honor of Huixtocihuatl. The festival culminated with the sacrifice of Huixtocihuatl's ixiptla, the embodiment of the deity in human form.

== Associations ==
Huixtocihuatl was considered a provider god along with Chicomecoatl and Chalchiuhtlicue. The three were sisters who together provided people with three life essentials: salt, food, and water.

In Codex Telleriano-Remensis, Huixtocihuatl is associated with the goddess Ixcuina, who represented filth and excrement. This relationship suggests that Huixtocihuatl was likely associated with urine, which was seen as salty and impure. Her association with the provider gods was not necessarily positive, and her association with urine and filth was not necessarily negative. The Aztecs recognized filth and disorder as a vital stage in the patterns of growth and renewal.

== Iconography ==
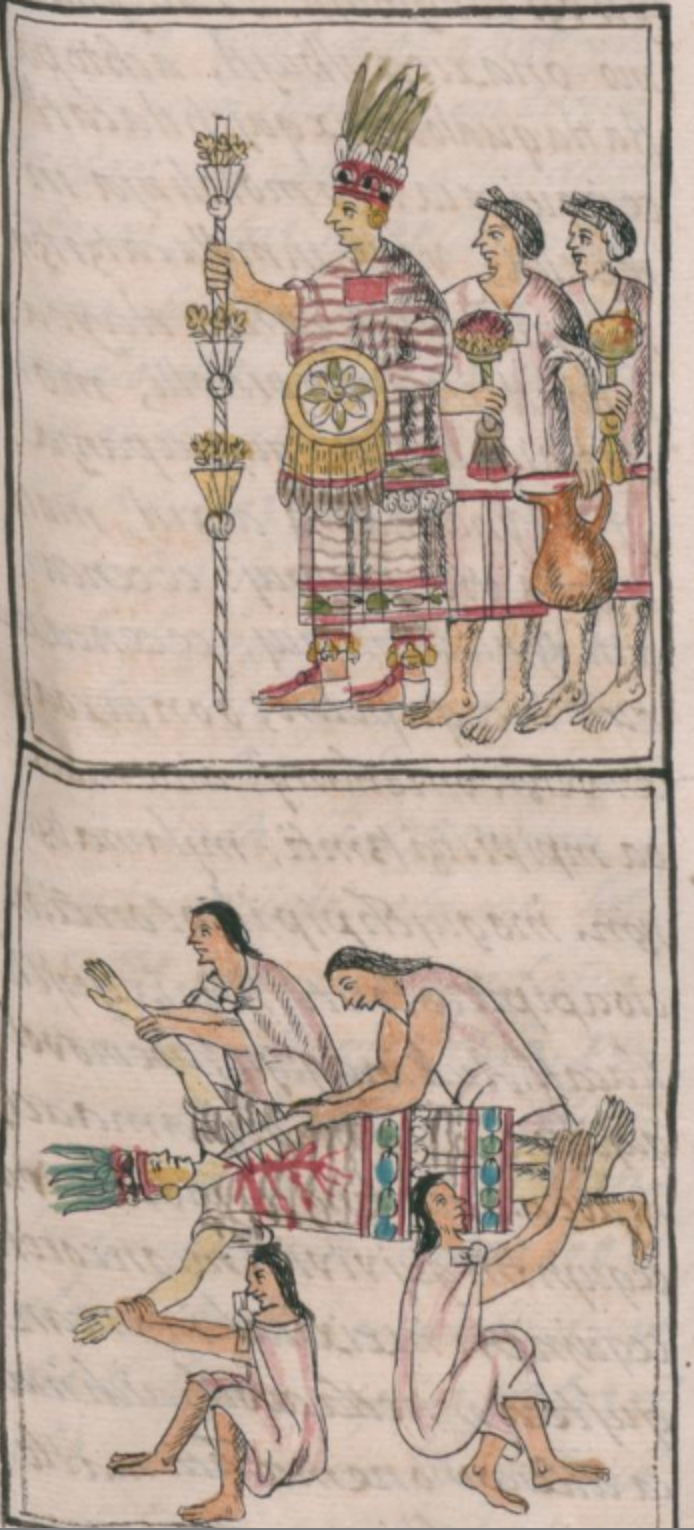
16th century illustration from the 2nd book, 26th chapter of Sahagun's Florentine Codex. The top panel depicts Huixtocihuatl's impersonator in a procession, while the bottom panel depicts the priests sacrificing her. Note the likeness of the ixiptla to a blossoming maize plant.

Primeros Memoriales, a manuscript written by Bernardino de Sahagún before his Florentine Codex, contains a description of Huixtocihuatl paired with an illustration. The Aztecs believed that the essence of a deity could be captured by a human impersonator, or ixiptla, of the god. Primeros Memoriales therefore illustrates and describes the likeness of Huixtocihuatl, who would have embodied the salt god. Sahagun's description closely follows its associated illustration, saying

Her facial paint is yellow.
Her paper crown has a quetzal feather crest.
Her gold ear plugs.
Her shift has the water design.
Her skirt has the water design.
Her small bells.
Her sandals.
Her shield has the water lily design.
In her hand is her reed staff.

In the Florentine Codex, Sahagún expands upon his description of Huixtocihuatl, describing the appearance of the deity captured by the impersonator. Sahagun likens her face paint, costume, and feathers to a maize plant at antithesis.

He says

Her [face] paint and ornamentation were yellow. This was of yellow ochre or the [yellow] of maize blossoms. And [she wore] her paper cap with quetzal feathers in the form of a tassel of maize. It was of many quetzal feathers, full of quetzal feathers, so that it was covered with green, streaming down, glistening like precious green feathers.

Sahagún goes on to describe Huixtocihuatl's other notable characteristics. He points out that her shirt and skirt were both embroidered with a design emulating water. The border of her shirt and skirt had a cloud design. These features, more closely related to water than to salt, may reflect Huixtocihuatl's familial ties to the water gods. Sahagún also points out that bells bound to an ocelot skin were attached to her ankles and legs. These bells made a symphony of noise when she walked. Sahagún furthermore provides details about Huixtocihuatl's sandals, shield, and reed staff. Her shield was covered with a water lily leaf design, hung with yellow parrot feathers, and swung around by the ixiptla when she danced. The reed staff also held an important role for the ixiptla, as it was what she used to mark the beat of songs during the festival in her honor.

== Ritual ==
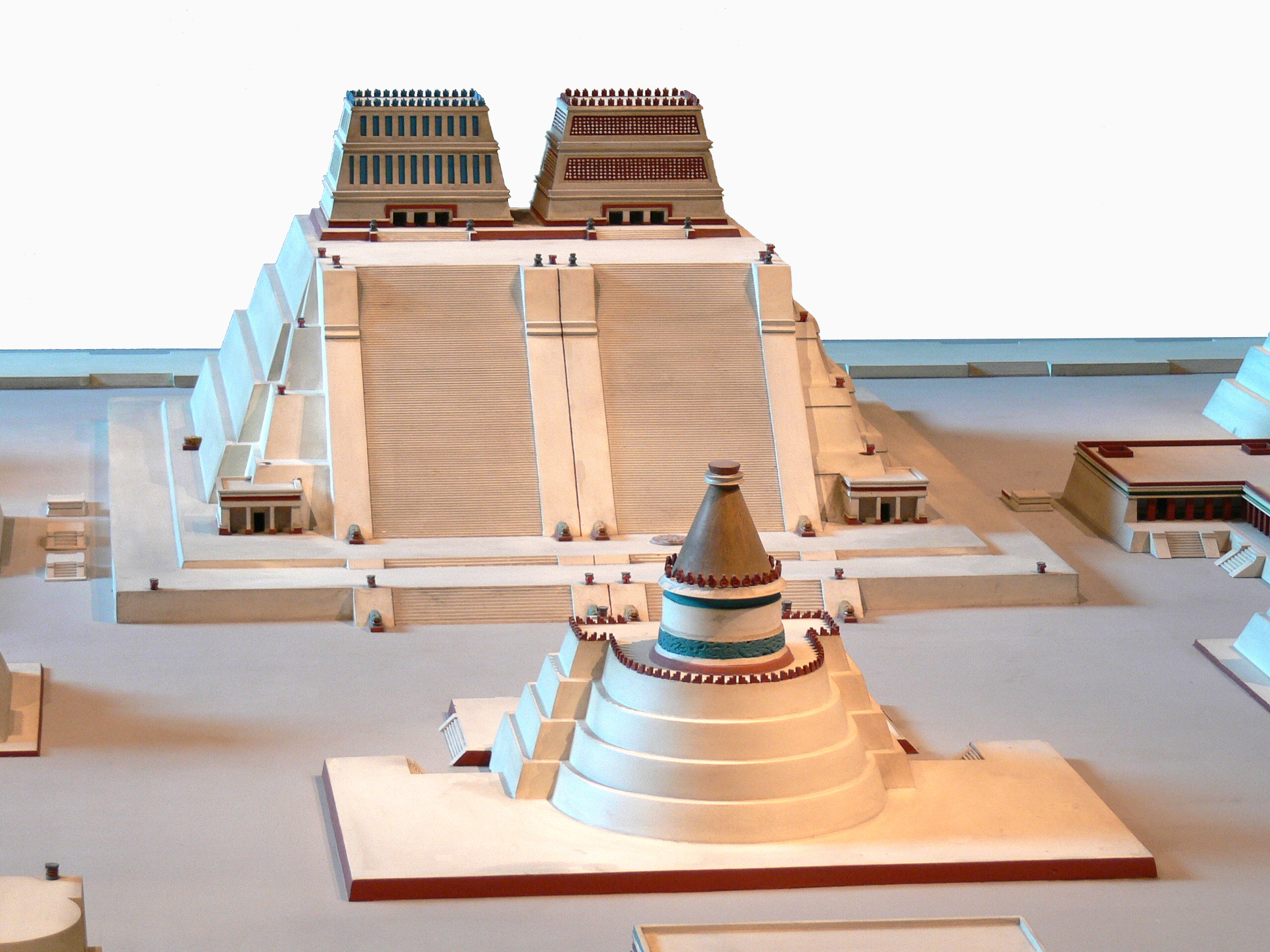
Reconstruction of the Templo Mayor at the National Museum of Anthropology in Mexico City. The temple on the left was dedicated to Tlaloc, the water deity. Huixtocihuatl's ixiptla would be sacrificed on Tlaloc's temple on the last day of Tecuilhuitontli.

During Tecuilhuitontli, the seventh month of the Aztec calendar which occurred in June, there was a festival in her honor. During the festival, one woman was considered to be the ixiptla, or the embodiment, of Huixtocihuatl. That woman would be sacrificed by the end of the festival.

Sahagún dedicates the second book of the Florentine Codex to describing the various ceremonies of the Aztecs. The twenty-sixth chapter of this book provides details about the ceremonies of Tecuilhuitontli, focusing on the festival in Huixtocihuatl's honor. Salt-makers would honor the deity with dances that lasted for ten days. Daughters of the salt-makers, and many more, engaged in these dances. In the Florentine Codex, Sahagún describes the range of participants in Huixtocihuatl's festival. He says

All gathered together and took their places, the salt people and the salt-makers - the old women, the mature women, the maidens, and maidens recently matured.

Dance played an important role in Tecuilhuitontli. Dancers arranged themselves in rows, and sang songs in a high tremble. Sahagún points out that their voices "rang like a bell". While the women sang and danced, the men and elders directed the dancers. The dancers wore garlands of iztauhyatl, the flower artemisia, while those watching the festival carried the flower. Song and dance in honor of Huixtocihuatl continued for ten days, and culminated on the last day of Tecuilhuitontli, when priests sacrificed the ixiptla on the shrine dedicated to Tlaloc on the Templo Mayor. Dancers escorted the likeness of Huixtocihuatl to the temple. Captives, to be slain along with the ixiptla, also joined the procession to the temple. Priests, adorned with quetzal feathers, slay the captives first. Sahagún emphasizes the significance of the sacrifice of the captives. He wrote that the captives would be

Her companions, her fellows in death; who were to be first, who would die [first].

Sahagún continues his description of Huixtocihuatl's sacrifice with vivid details of the ritual slaughter. Priests used the sharp snout of a sword fish to cut into her neck, then into her breast. Afterwards, the priests cut her heart out, raised it as an offering, and stored it in a green stone jar. Sahagún explains that after the sacrifice, people scattered and celebrated the end of the festival with banquets. All those who were affiliated with salt would drink wine. Sahagún describes the atmosphere of the night, pointing out that participants in the festival were drunk by the time they went to sleep.
