= Nēmontēmi =

Five intercalary days inserted between years of the Aztec calendar

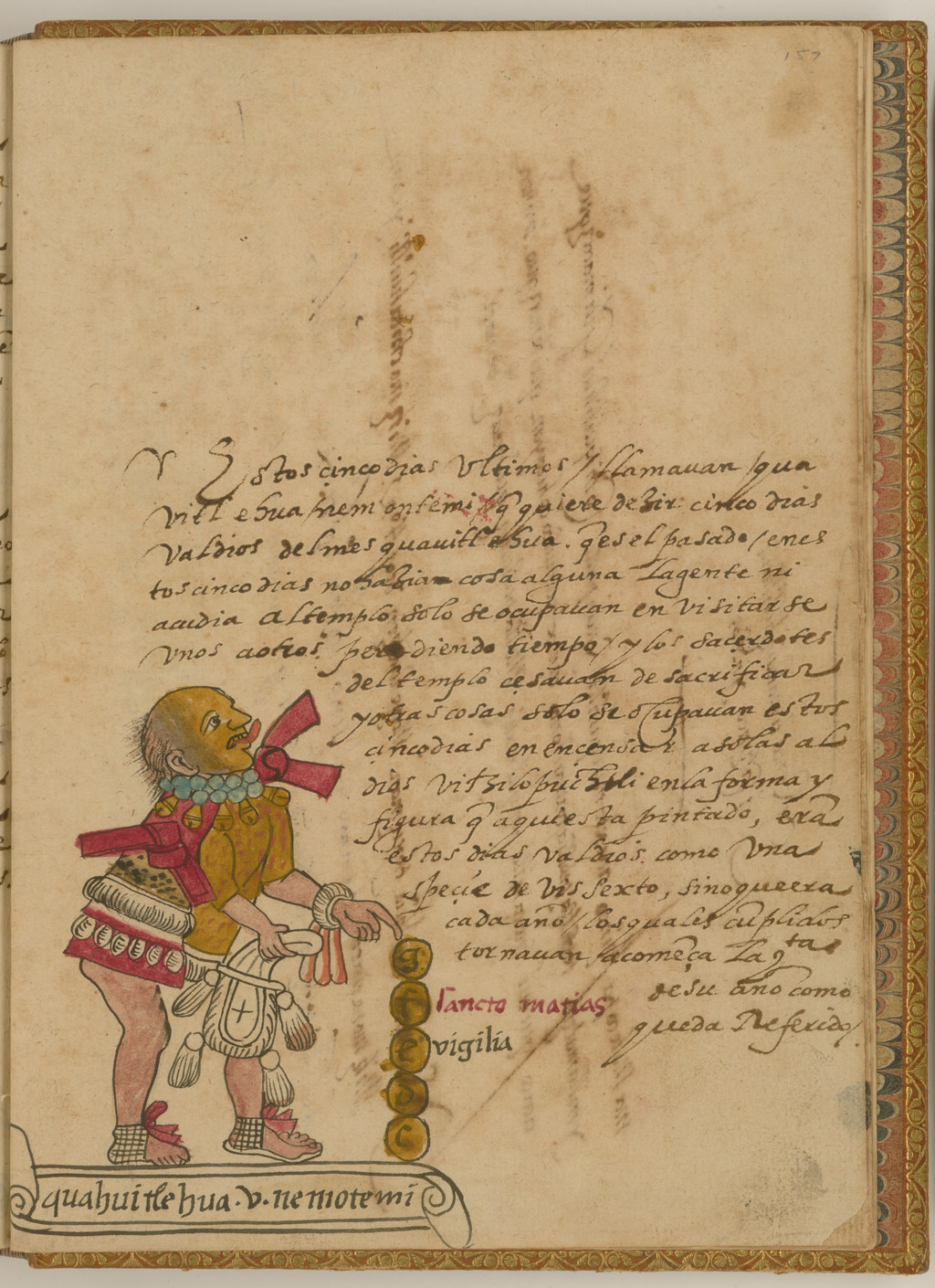
An illustration of the God, Huitzilopochtli, and description of the Nemontemi days

In the Aztec (Mexica) culture, the Nahuatl word nēmontēmi refers to a period of five intercalary days inserted between the 360 days labeled with numbers and day-names in the main part of the Aztec seasonal calendar. Their location was roughly around 5–18 March every Gregorian year.

== Etymology ==
The word nēmontēmi means "they fill up in vain". Spanish lexicographers glossed it as dias baldios, "wasted days". The interpretation is that the Mexicas considered the days unlucky, and most activities (including even cooking) were avoided as far as possible during the nēmontēmi period; however this interpretation is contested by Indigenous people.

According to Meza Gutierrez, Indigenous people used the 5 day period to reflect over the past year, and that this contemplation often included a period of fasting.

== Position in Aztec calendar ==
Each of the 18 Aztec "months" had 20 days, for a total of 360 days. The nēmontēmi accounted for the remaining 5 whole days in the nearly 365 ¼ day tropical year (365.2422, actual). There were no "leap days" or "leap years" per-se, so over the course of 52 calendar years of 365 days each, the calendar accumulated a deficit of 13 days, which the Julian calendar (for example) accommodates by adding leap days once every four years.

According to Tunnicliffe (1979) the Aztecs dealt with the remaining fractional-day discrepancy with the true tropical year length by adding a trecena (13 days) after each bundle of 52 years. The 13 days were not considered unlucky, but they were not labeled using the count (numbers and symbol) combinations used for the rest of the Aztec calendar, as they have their own unique count.

A notable Indigenous leader born in the Nemontemi, was the Cuauhtemoctzin, one of the last tlahtoani of Mexico-Tenochtitlan.

== See also ==
- Intercalary month (Egypt)
