= Guillermo Marín Ruiz =

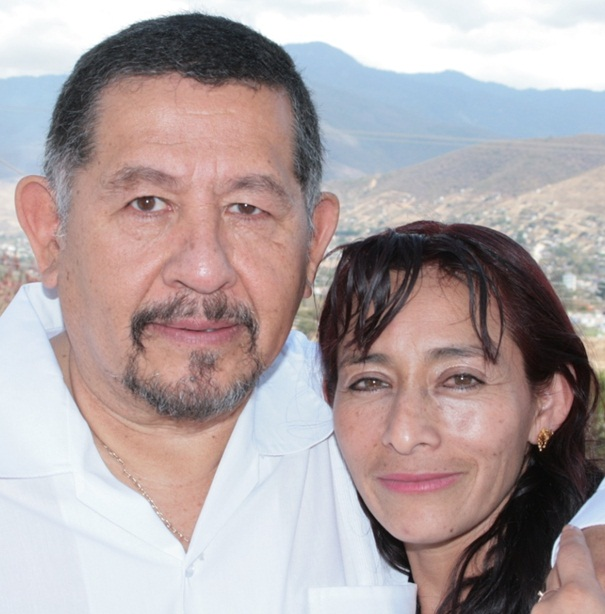
- With wife, Luz del Carmen, in Oaxaca
- Born: 30 April 1952 (age 74); Mexico City, Mexico
- Education: UNAM
- Occupations: Writer, Cultural Promoter
- Writing career
- Genres: Indigenous Mexican History and original culture, Toltecáyotl
- Movement: Toltec - Toltecáyotl
- Website: toltecayotl.org

Guillermo Marín Ruiz (30 April 1952) is an independent writer, cultural promoter, and researcher of multiple works, mainly related to Toltecayotl which refers to the cultural and philosophical roots of Indigenous civilization and history in what is now known as Mexico.

== Biography ==
Marín studied at the National Autonomous University of Mexico and graduated with a bachelor's degree in business administration in 1974 at the UNAM Mexico City campus. After spending a few years working in the business sector, he decided to relocate to Europe, and during the time he spent in Spain, he took a course on the history of the Americas, at the Complutense University of Madrid. Later, he came in contact with the work of Carlos Castaneda, a Peruvian-born American anthropologist and author who was influential at the time. Castaneda's work motivated Marin to explore his indigenous roots, prompting him to return to Mexico.

Since then, Marin has lived in the State of Oaxaca, one with the largest indigenous population in the country, and has dedicated his life to study and promote the Indigenous history of Mexico and the ancestral philosophical roots of its contemporary culture. He established long-lasting friendships with Mexican Anthropologist Guillermo Bonfil Batalla, the author of "Mexico Profundo: Reclaiming a Civilization", and Rubén Bonifaz Nuño, poet and translator of the Náhuatl language. Marín was profoundly influenced by these authors, especially Bonfil Batalla who argued that Mexicans were pushed to forget their Indigenous roots and culture in a process of "deindianization" in order to have a national culture based on "mestizaje" which is another category associated to colonization and the caste system in Latin America. Marín embarked in a lifelong effort to teach and promote the basic premises of Toltecáyotl as a cultural system that is still alive in the daily practices of Mexicans, although they may not fully reflect on it because the official education system does not teach comprehensively about the original cultures of Mexico, and instead focuses on the philosophical precepts of European culture. This, Marin says, has produced citizens who are "uncultivated strangers in our own land" according to his words . In 1991, Marín studied in Venezuela at the UNESCO Latin American and Caribbean Center for Cultural development. Subsequently, he became director of the Center for Research and Dissemination of Mexican Culture, was appointed State Commission Coordinators Adviser for the Independence bicentennial and Revolution centennial commemoration and President of the Cultural Promoters National Association A.C. in 1996. He often teaches seminars, classes and gives talks and interviews in community centers, schools, local radio and cultural centers as a form of community service or "tequio," a common practice among indigenous communities consisting in providing volunteer work for the betterment of the whole community. He has made his publications available for free on his website in order to spread awareness about the philosophical and cultural values of the civilization that developed for thousands of years in the continent known as Cem Anahuac, or "between two waters" in the Náhuatl language.

Guillermo Marín has a humanist background in history, the Anahuac civilization philosophy (Toltecáyotl) and in cultural development. He writes for different newspapers such as El Imparcial, La Jornada, "Uno mas Uno" and the Autonomous University of Baja California magazine. Marin has also been awarded distinctions, such as an award of the Government of Rumania for cultural exchange activities in 1984, the academic merit medal awarded by the "Universidad José Vasconcelos" of Oaxaca. In 2018, the University José Vasconcelos also gave Marín a Doctorate Honoris Causa recognizing his work teaching the principles of Toltecáyotl through his blog which has millions of visits, his participation in different media outlets, and his dedication to the community by teaching seminars and workshops in schools and community organizations in the state of Oaxaca, other parts of Mexico, and the United States.

== Main Topics and Cultural Promotion ==
During his talks, workshops and seminars Marin focuses on the Anahuac civilization, and how their original culture spawned latter cultures such as the Chichimeca, Purépecha, Zapotec, Mixtec, Mayan, Huasteca and others. Furthermore, he explains how these Native groups of the "Anáhuac" share cultural and philosophical roots with each other, though occurring in different times and locations. The multicultural mosaic of ethnicities and languages, as well as the continued traditions, festivals, cuisine, folk art, music and dance, are examples of the original Indigenous "Mother Culture" found in 21st century inhabitants of what is now known as Mexico. All of which are aspects Marin believes must be preserved and valued. Among his other efforts are to promote the awareness of the diversity of Mexico, reflected not only in its museums and archeological zones, but also on the everyday artistic production of handicrafts and art by different groups in the country, He also highlights the predominance of Eurocentricism, mixed into the dominant cultural narrative of Mexico.

Guillermo Marín Ruiz books are likewise based on the ancestral roots of Mexico. In Daany Beédxe, a fictional novel, he writes about the ancient Anahuaca civilization, and recreates how society may have been before the European Conquest. In some of his non-fictional works such as Los Guerreros de la Muerte Florecida and Pedagogía Tolteca, Marin focuses on the foundation of Toltecayotl as a philosophical system, and how these philosophies remain relevant in Mexican culture, respectively. In the book Para leer a Carlos Castaneda, Marín concentrates on both the Toltec philosophies and Carlos Castaneda, in which he "presents in a simple and clear manner, the men of knowledge methodology".

== Books ==
- Apuntes sobre la Administración Cultural. (1987) ISBN 968-6204-15-6
- Para leer a Carlos Castaneda (1992)(1994) ISBN 84-86668-82-4
- Para leer a Carlos Castaneda (1999) ISBN 968-867-093-6
- Manual Básico del Promotor Cultural.(1994) ISBN 968-7379-07-3
- Manual Básico del Promotor Cultural. (1996) ISBN 968-29-9755-0
- Daany Beédxe (El Espíritu del Guerrero) (1997).
- Los viejos abuelos. (2000) .
- La Corrupción en México. (2001)
- Los Guerreros de la Muerte Florecida. (2007) ISBN 968-9240-01-3
- Historia verdadera del México profundo. (1997) (2005) (2007) (2010)
- Mitla Tlatócan. México. (1994) ISBN 968-7379-00-6
- Monte Albán (1999) ISBN 968-7379-01-4
- Los tesoros de Monte Albán (1999) ISBN 968-7379-01-4
- Anáhuac Esencia y Raíz de México Tlatócan. México. (2010)
- El mito de la modernidad (1999)
- Pedagogía Tolteca. (2009) 70312090100-01
- Los seis elementos culturales que identifican a la Civilización del Anáhuac Tlatócan. Oaxaca, México. sección Libros. (2010)
- Mitos y fantasías de los Aztecas, Los Españoles y la conquista de México Tlatócan. Oaxaca, México. sección Libros. (2010)
- Hierofanias del Anahuac. Tlatócan. Oaxaca, México. sección Libros. (2007)
- Nuestras Raíces Programa de Educación Migrante. California, E.U. (2002)
- La ideología criolla en la conformación de la Nación Mexicana Tlatócan. Oaxaca, México. sección Libros. (2005)
- Octavio Paz y su percepción del "México prehispánico" Tlatócan. Oaxaca, México. sección Libros. (2010)
