= Jorge R. Acosta =

Mexican archaeologist

Jorge Ruffier Acosta
- Born: 1908; Beijing, Qing dynasty (now China)
- Died: 5 March 1975 (aged 66–67); Mexico City, Mexico
- Occupation: Archaeologist

Jorge Ruffier Acosta (1908 – 5 March 1975) was a Mexican archaeologist who worked on numerous major archaeological sites in Mesoamerica, including Chichen Itza, Teotihuacán, Oaxaca, Palenque, Monte Albán and Tula. His excavations at Tula were the first to prove that the ruins there were that of the legendary city of Tollan, the capital of the Toltec state. He also greatly influenced the practice of cultural conservation in Mexico.
