= Chalchiuhtlatonac (Tollan) =

Legendary Toltec governor

In Toltec legend, Chalchiuhtlatonac (Precious-stone-who-shines) was the second son of a ruler of the Chichemecs who governed the Toltecs for 52 years. He obtained this position because in a step toward diplomacy, the Toltecs to the south had asked the ruler to provide a chief from his family, and he, much flattered, gave them Chalchiuhtlatonac, his second son. He was crowned at Tollan.
