= Theater Square fountain (Rostov-on-Don) =

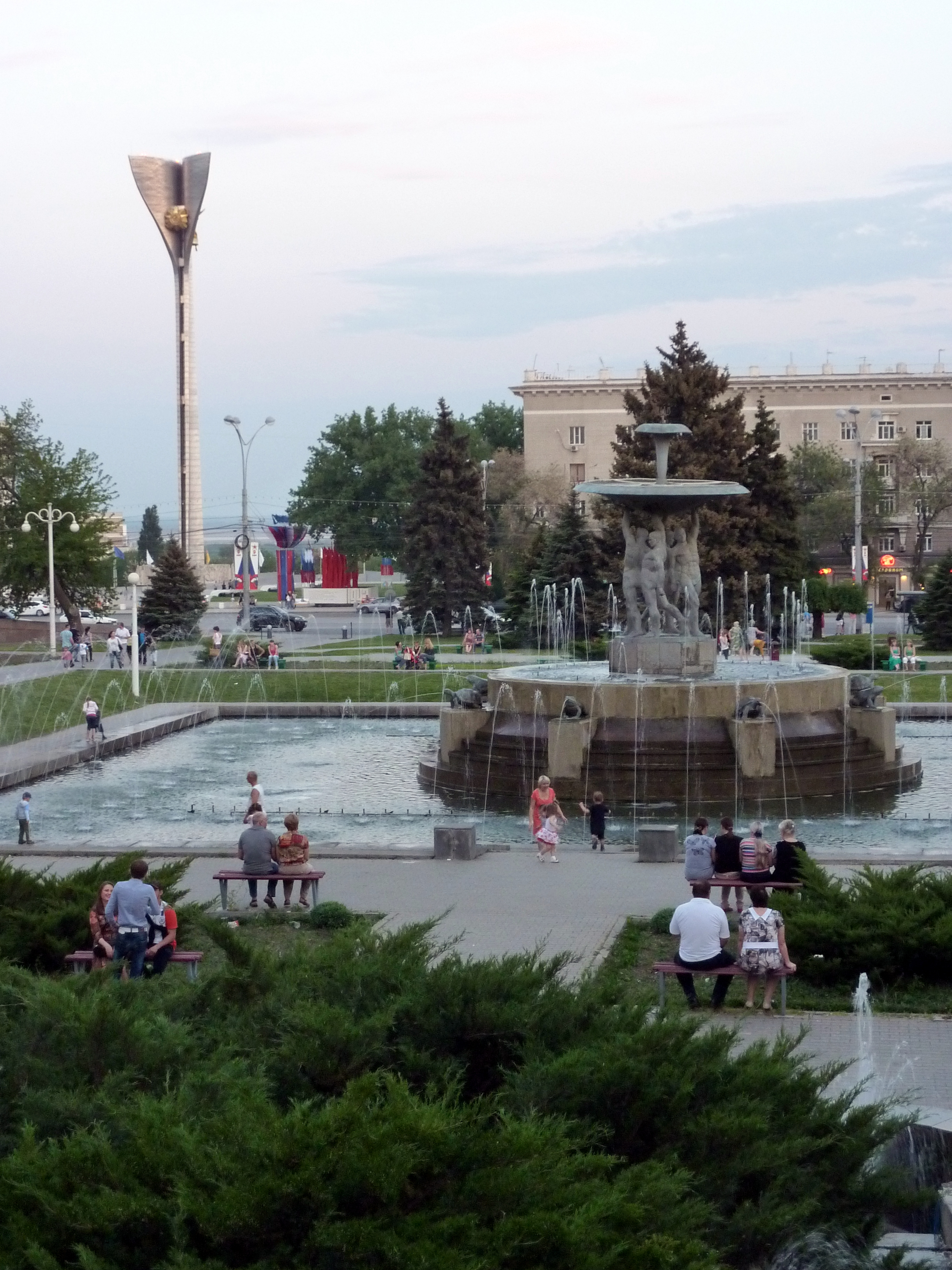

- Location within Russia
- Type: Fountain
- Location: Rostov-on-Don, Rostov Oblast Russia

The Theater Square fountain (Russian: Фонтан на Театральной площади) is a fountain in the city of Rostov-on-Don, Russia.

The fountain was created by sculptor Yevgeny Vuchetich.

After the construction of the theater. M. Gorky in 1936, next to it was equipped the Theater Square with a fountain in the center. The fountain is a sculptural group of Atlanteans on a pedestal, popularly called "peasants with a bowl."

During the Great Patriotic War, the fountain was destroyed, restored in the 1950s in full. But in the 1970s there were no frogs with turtles on the fountain.

On the eve of the 250th anniversary of Rostov-on-Don, which was celebrated in 1999, the fountain was restored, giving it its original appearance.
