= Tōllān =

City name

Tollan, Tolan, or Tolán is a name used for the capital cities of two empires of Pre-Columbian Mesoamerica; first for Teotihuacan, and later for the Toltec capital, Tula, both in Mexico. The name has also been applied to the Postclassic Mexican settlement Cholula.

Tollan is a word in Nahuatl used in Spanish colonial documents. Traditionally, tollan was interpreted as a Nahuatl toponym for Tula, Hidalgo. More recent scholarship suggests some kind of broader meaning, such as 'a place of the reeds'. Instead of a toponym for a specific settlement, it is also used as a qualifier to denote a category of densely populated cities.

Teotihuacan seems to have been the first city known by this name. After the collapse of the Teotihuacan empire, central Mexico broke into smaller states. The Toltec created the first sizable Mexican empire after the fall of Teotihuacan, and their capital was referred to by the same name as a reference to the earlier greatness of Teotihuacan.

In Aztec accounts at the time of the arrival of the Conquistadores, Teotihuacan and the Toltec capital sometimes seem to be confused and conflated.

The epithet Tollan was also sometimes applied to any great metropolis or capital. Cholula, for example, was sometimes called Tollan Cholula, and the Aztec capital of Tenochtitlán was likewise given the title Tollan. The Mixtec translation of this, Ñuu Co'yo is still the Mixtec name for Mexico City to this day.

== Tollan in Mesoamerican mythology ==
Tollan is the name given to the mythical place of origin in many Mesoamerican traditions, including those of the Aztecs and the K'iche' Maya. In the K'iche' epic Popol Vuh, the first people created are gathered at Tollan, the place of seven caves, where they receive their languages and their gods.

== See also ==
- Chalchiuhtlatonac (Tollan)

== Bibliography ==
- Read, Kay Almere; Jason González (2000). Handbook of Mesoamerican Mythology. Oxford: ABC-CLIO. ISBN 1-85109-340-0. OCLC 43879188.
