= Atlantean figures =

Collection of four statues in Mesoamerica

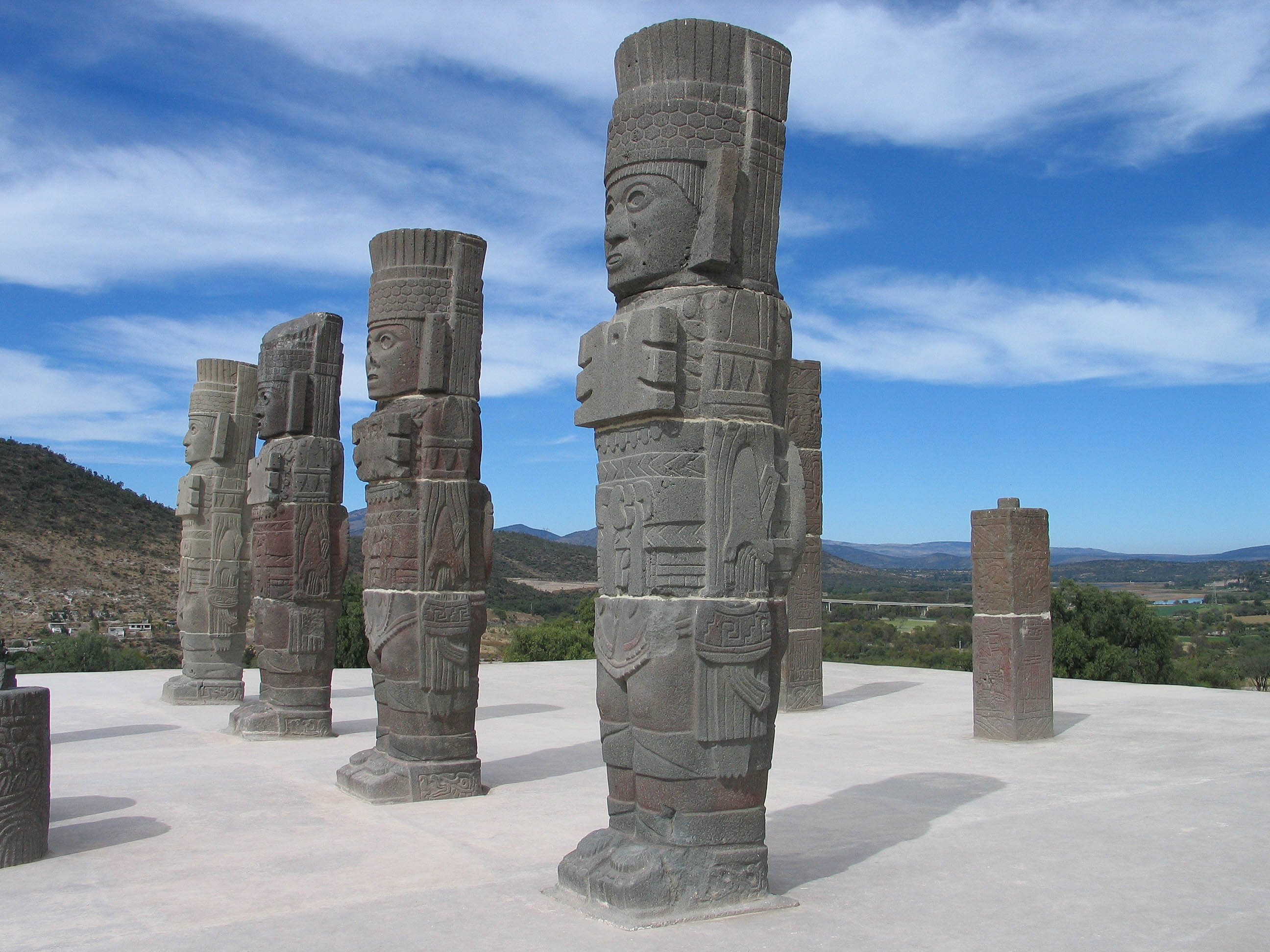
Columns in the form of Toltec warriors in Tula

The Atlantean figures are four anthropomorphic statues belonging to the Toltec culture in pre-Columbian Mesoamerica. These figures are "massive statues of Toltec warriors". They take their post-Columbian name from the European tradition of similar Atlas or Atalante figures in classical architecture.

Though the most famous Atlantean figures reside in Tula, the Olmecs were the first to use Atlantean figures on a relief discovered in Potrero Nuevo. Mayan sculptors also created "Atlantean" figures in Chichen Itza. Furthermore, the Aztecs also created warrior statues strongly inspired by these Atlantean figures in Tula.

== Composition ==
The Atlantean figures in Tula are hand-carved statues made from the available stone in the area: limestone, sandstone, and volcanic rock. To carve them, sculptors would have used stone tools, such as chisels for fine sculpting, scrapers of various sizes, and stone hammers. Additional smaller and softer stones were used for smoothing. The process of creating these figures would have been very time-consuming, which is an indication to the importance of these figures to its civilization.

== Earliest example of Atlantes in Mesoamerica ==
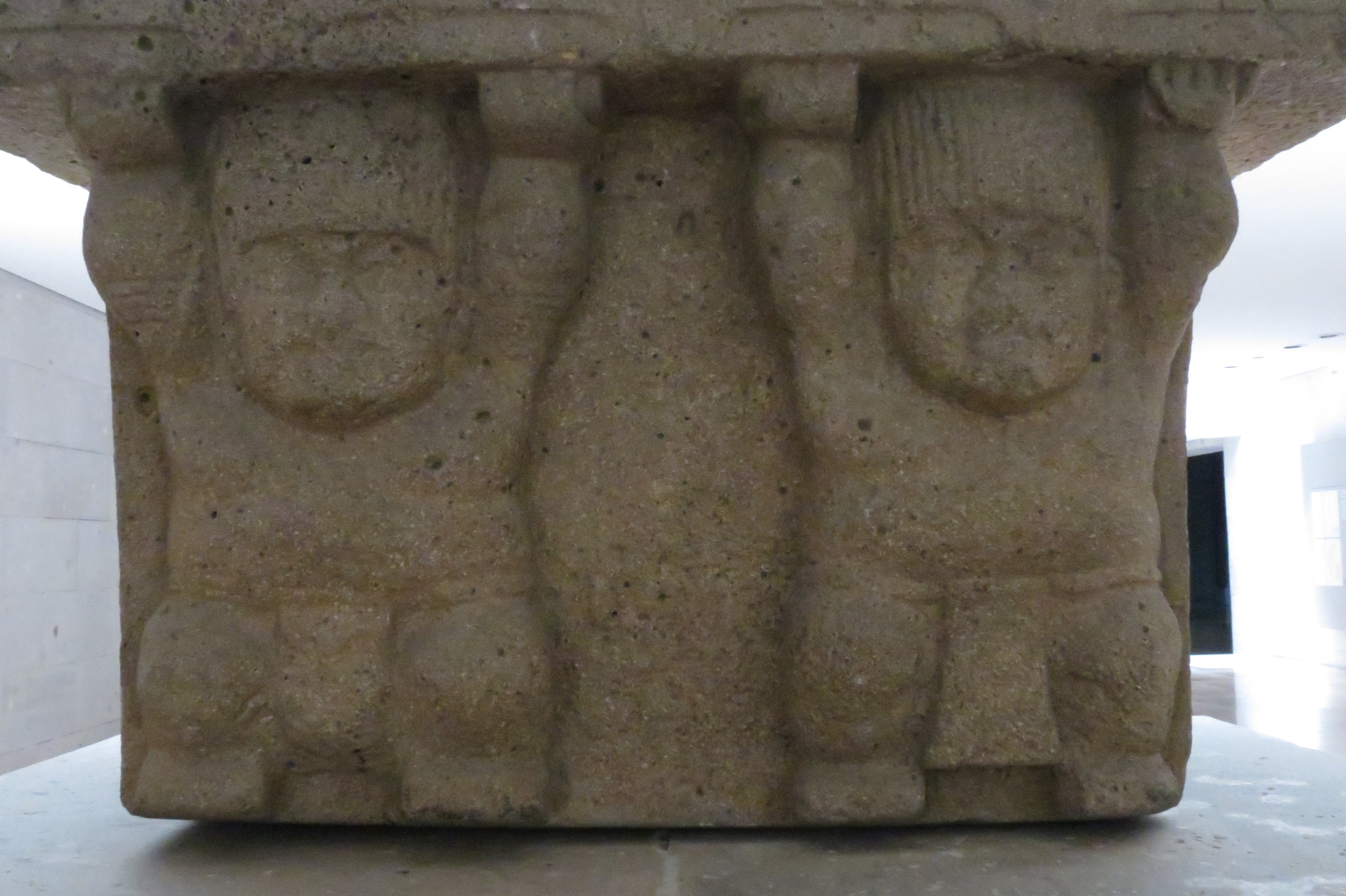
This sculpture, created by the Olmecs, is located in the Museum of Anthropology of Xalapa, Veracruz. The sculpture represents the first use of atlantes in Mesoamerica. However, it differs from the Atlantean figures in Tula because it is not in-the-round, and is instead a relief on a table.

At Potrero Nuevo near San Lorenzo, part of San Lorenzo Tenochtitlán, there is an altar supported by two Atlantean figures created by The Olmecs. It is believed to be the "oldest Mesoamerican example of the themes of atlantes holding up altars or ceilings" The atlantes at this site are also unique compared to those found at other sites. The atlantes are not carved in the round like they are at later sites, rather they are carved as a relief.

== Toltec Atlantean figures from Tula ==
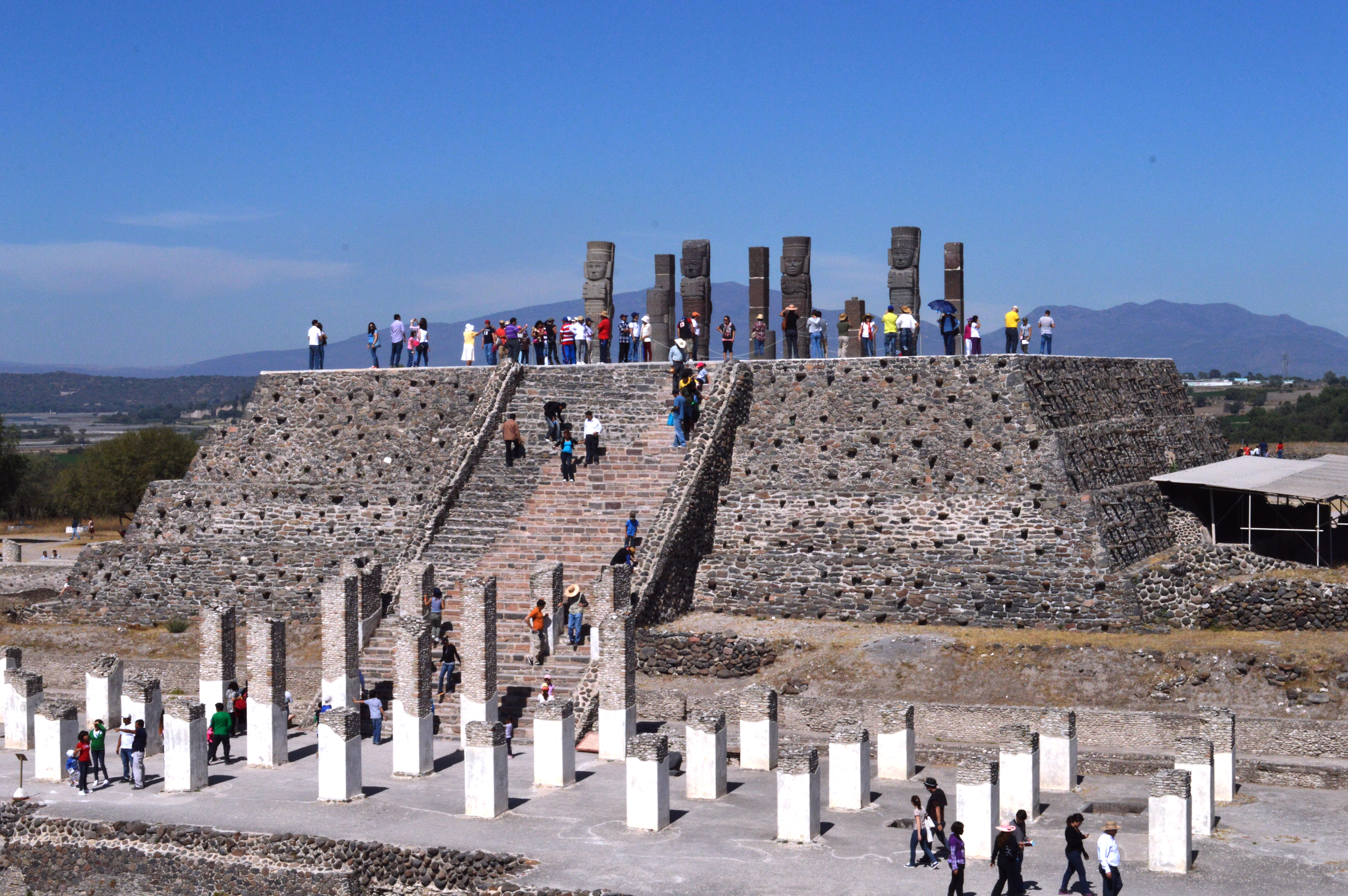
The four monumental Atlantean figures in Tula were located on top of Pyramid B. Originally, they provided the support for a structure on top of the pyramid.

Tula has long been considered the capital for the Toltec people. At Tula one can find the Temple of Tlahuizcalpantecuhtli ('House of the Morning Star' or 'The Temple of the Lord in the Dawn'), where there are four Atlantean figures standing over 4.6 metres (15 ft) tall. The figures here are depicted as wearing "stylized butterfly breastplates, sun-shaped shields on their backs, feathered headdresses and carry spear throwers and a supply of spears".

=== Dating ===
The exact dates for when Atlantean figures in Tula were carved is unknown. However, rough estimates can be made by dating the sites. The construction of the Toltec empire has been dated to approximately A.D. 750. This dates mark the earliest time that the figures could have been carved.

== Other sites ==
=== Mayan Atlantean figures from Chichen Itza ===
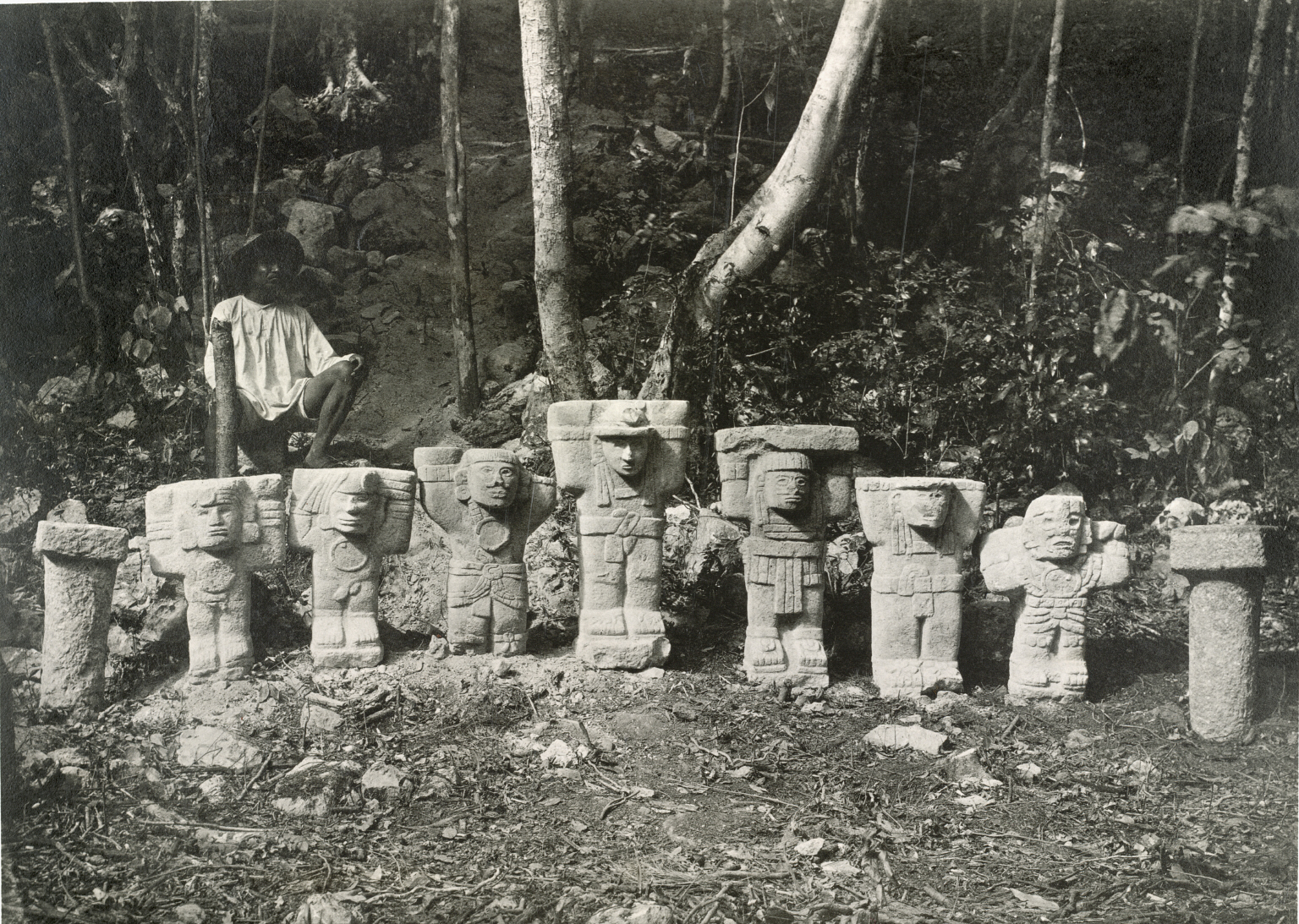
A group of Atlantean figures created by the Maya peoples from Chichen Itza

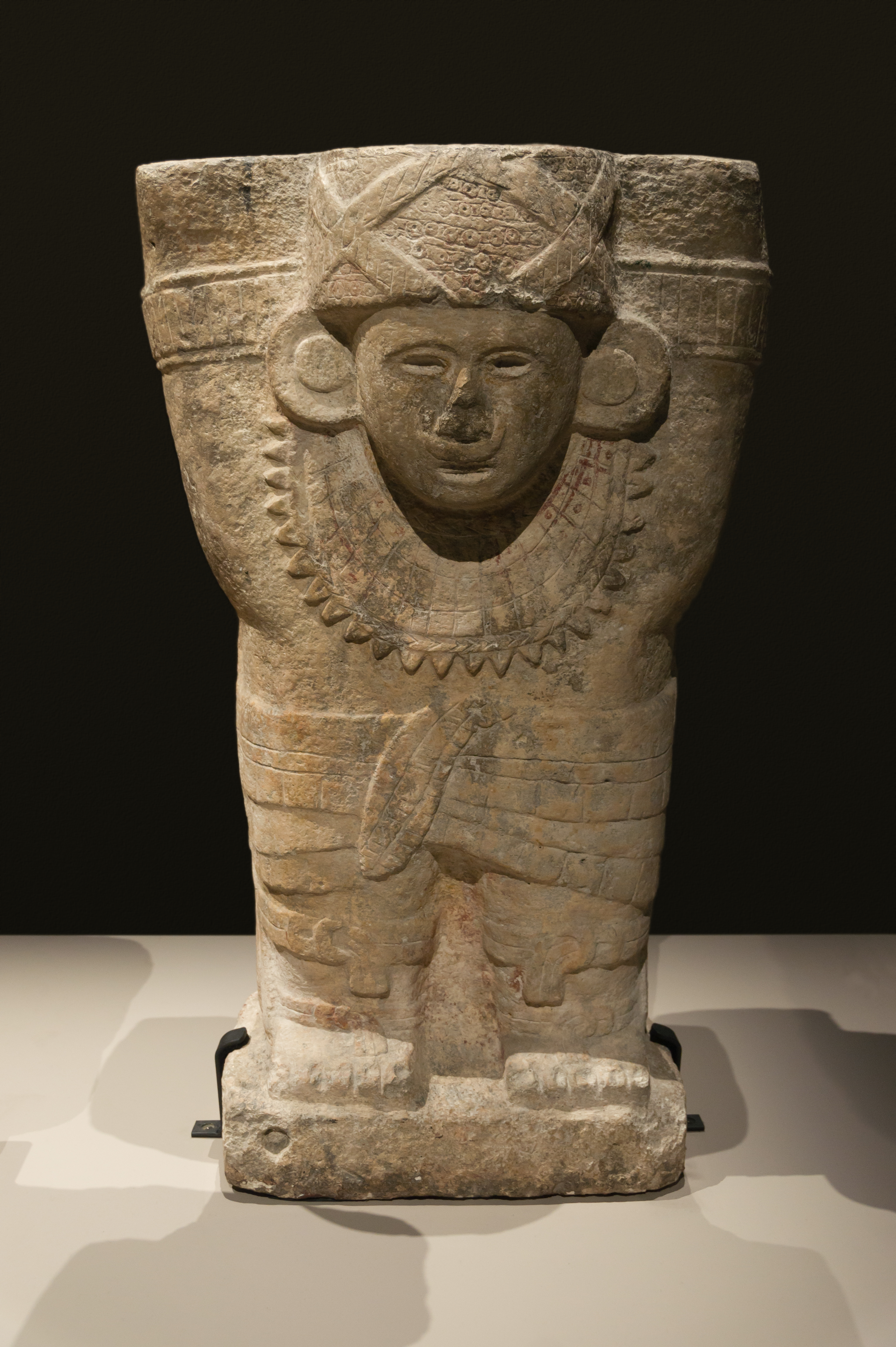
Figure from Chichen Itza, dated 900-1250CE

Built by the Maya people, Chichen Itza is a site located on the northern center of the Yucatán Peninsula and contains what is known as the Temple of Warriors. At the top of the temple, used as support for the roof, run columns of the carved warriors, each wearing a feathered headdress, a butterfly-shaped pectoral, and holding a dart thrower and darts. Like the Atlantean figures in Tula, the figures from Chichen Itza have not been dated exactly. The construction of Chichen Itza took place between A.D.100-250.

=== Aztec Atlantean figures from Tenochtitlan ===
The Aztec Atlantean figures were created by an unknown Aztec artist ca. 1500. They are made of basalt and measure to be about 120x42x37 centimeters. Currently, the five figures are located at Museo Nacional de Antropología, Mexico City. The Aztec Atlantean figures were inspired by the Toltec Atlantean figures, which is visible through their resembling structure and similar iconography such as their traditional military attire, spears, clay nose bars, which is symbolic of military prowess, and the butterfly breast plate. The butterfly breastplate is significant as butterflies were symbolic of warriors, fire, death, and rebirth. The Aztecs believed butterflies to be the embodiment of Aztec souls, specifically the souls of warriors slain in battle.

The five atlantean figures were located in Tenochtitlan, the Aztec capital which was believed by the Aztec to be the center of the universe. The statues were arranged with one in the center and four surrounding it, positioned in the North, East, South, and West. This specific setup is related to Aztec cosmology as it was representative of the axis Mundi, Tenochtitlan, and the four cardinal directions. The cardinal directions represent the four quadrants of the cosmos and is decided by the path of the sun. Each quadrant of the Earth holds power, brought together and unified by a fifth power in the middle, the axis mundi. The cardinal directions were a foundational aspect to Aztec society and constituted the layout for the city of Tenochtitlan and is the principle on which the aztec calendar was built. Each quadrant was affiliated with specific deities, sacred trees, colors, or birds.

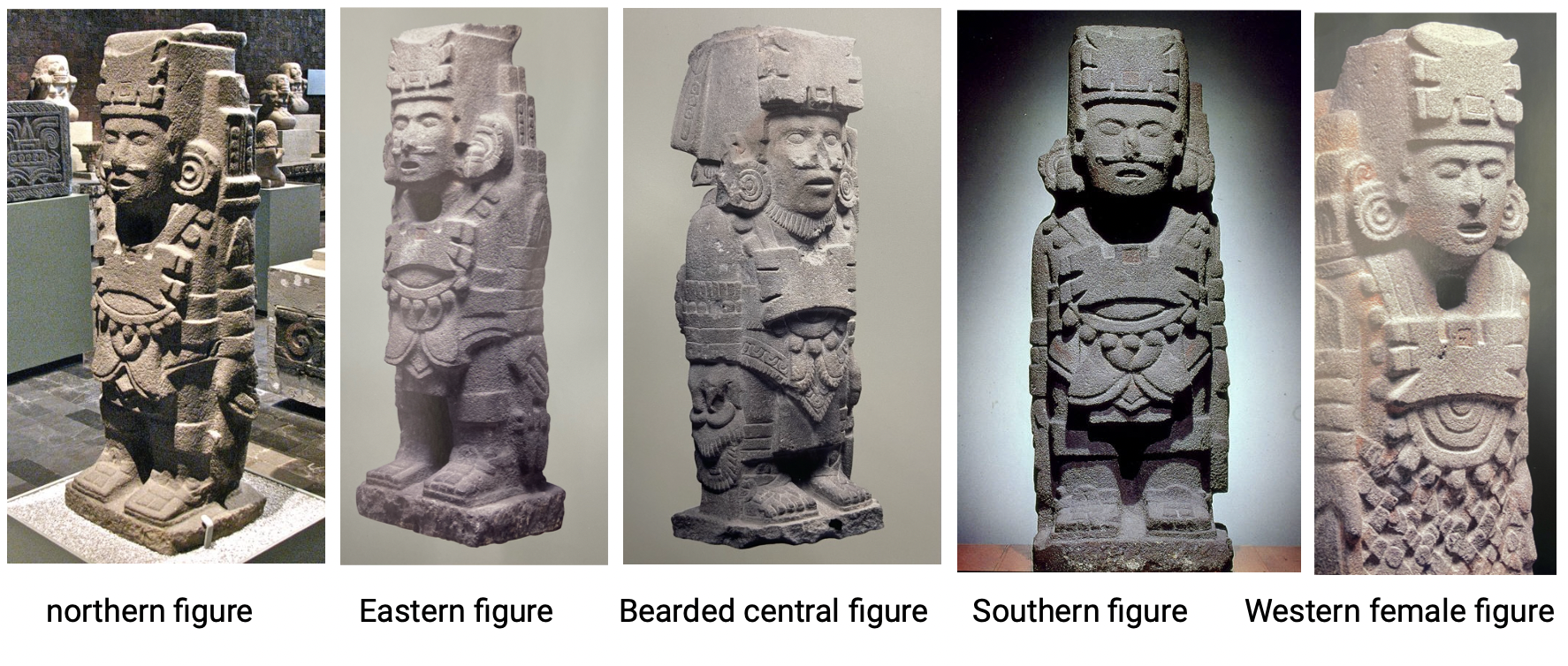
Pictures is each of the five aztec atlantean figures. Under each image is labeled which figure it was and where it was located in the original configuration.

Of these five atlantean figures, one was female while the rest were male. One bearded male warrior originally stood in the center of the group, while three other male soldier stood North, East and South. The fifth sculpture, a female warrior, stood West. These warriors marked the center and four directions of the universe, and were meant to guard the sun. The Aztecs constantly strived to prove their rule was divinely fated and aligned with the desires of the cosmos. Aztecs used sculptural monuments as a way to commemorate significant events of Aztec history to reinforce their cosmic destiny and imperial aspirations. These figures typically were decorated with cosmic iconography to represent the connection between Aztec historical events and cosmic destiny. The five atlantean figures may go beyond just representing the cardinal directions and axis mundi, but also to commemorate the migration led by Huitzilopochtli from Aztlan and the discovery of Tenochtitlan. The central figure, which represents the axis mundi, in turn represents Tenochtitlan and the four surrounding figures represent the four ancestral cities of the Valley of Mexico which surrounded the Empire. Another explanation is that during the migration, Huitzilopochtli manifested into four sacred bundles, called tlaquimilolli. These bundles were carried by four Aztec individuals, three males and one female, who were called, Tezcacoatl, Cuauhcoatl, Apanecatl and Chimalma. This story is depicted in pictorial sequence in the Codex Boturini. It could be explained that the four Atlantean figures represent the four individuals whom carried Huitzilopochtli to Tenochtitlan, which is represented by the central figure depicting the axis mundi.

==== Toltec influence ====
Tula, the ancient Toltec capital, collapsed in the 12th century, before the Aztecs established their own city-states. The Aztec people originally migrated from Aztlan across the central highlands before they reached the valley of Mexico, where they established Tenochtitlan. During their migration, they passed through the ruins of Tula.

The Aztecs regarded their predecessors, the Toltecs, as great warriors. The Toltecs conquered nearby peoples and then were paid tribute at Tula. Similar to the Toltecs, the Aztecs utilized tribute-towns to pay maize and other goods to Tenochtitlan. Toltecayotl, which translates in Nahuatl to "to have a Toltec heart", was a term that indicated greatness, displaying the Aztecs' reverence of the Toltecs. According to Richard Townsend,

"[Toltecayotl] was to excel, to be worthy, to possess extraordinary qualities in the manner of the ancients."

The Toltec Empire was a former warrior nation whom the Aztec admired and revered. The purposeful similarities between the Toltec and Aztec figures is done to draw association between the two empires and bring legitimacy to the Aztec rule through association with their nobility and culture. The Aztecs viewed the Toltecs as the epitome of aesthetic sensibility, military prowess, and political success. The Aztec figures symbolized the ideal of a noble warrior through consciously imitating the Toltec atlantean figures and drawing an association between Aztec warriors and the powerful, fearless Toltec warriors. As well, by demonstrating a ruler's connection to the Toltec lineage, it substantiated and legitimized their authority, reminding the Aztec they are descendants of the noble, royal line of the Toltecs, acting as cosmic confirmation for their rule.

The Atlantean figures of Tenochtitlan were not the only sculptures that showed resemblance to the sculpture of Tula. Aztec standard-bearer statues, seating figures with flagpoles, are very similar to those found in Tula. Furthermore, the Aztecs created chacmools, reclining figures used for rituals, based on those that they encountered in Tula.

Comparison between Toltec Chacmool and Aztec Chacmool

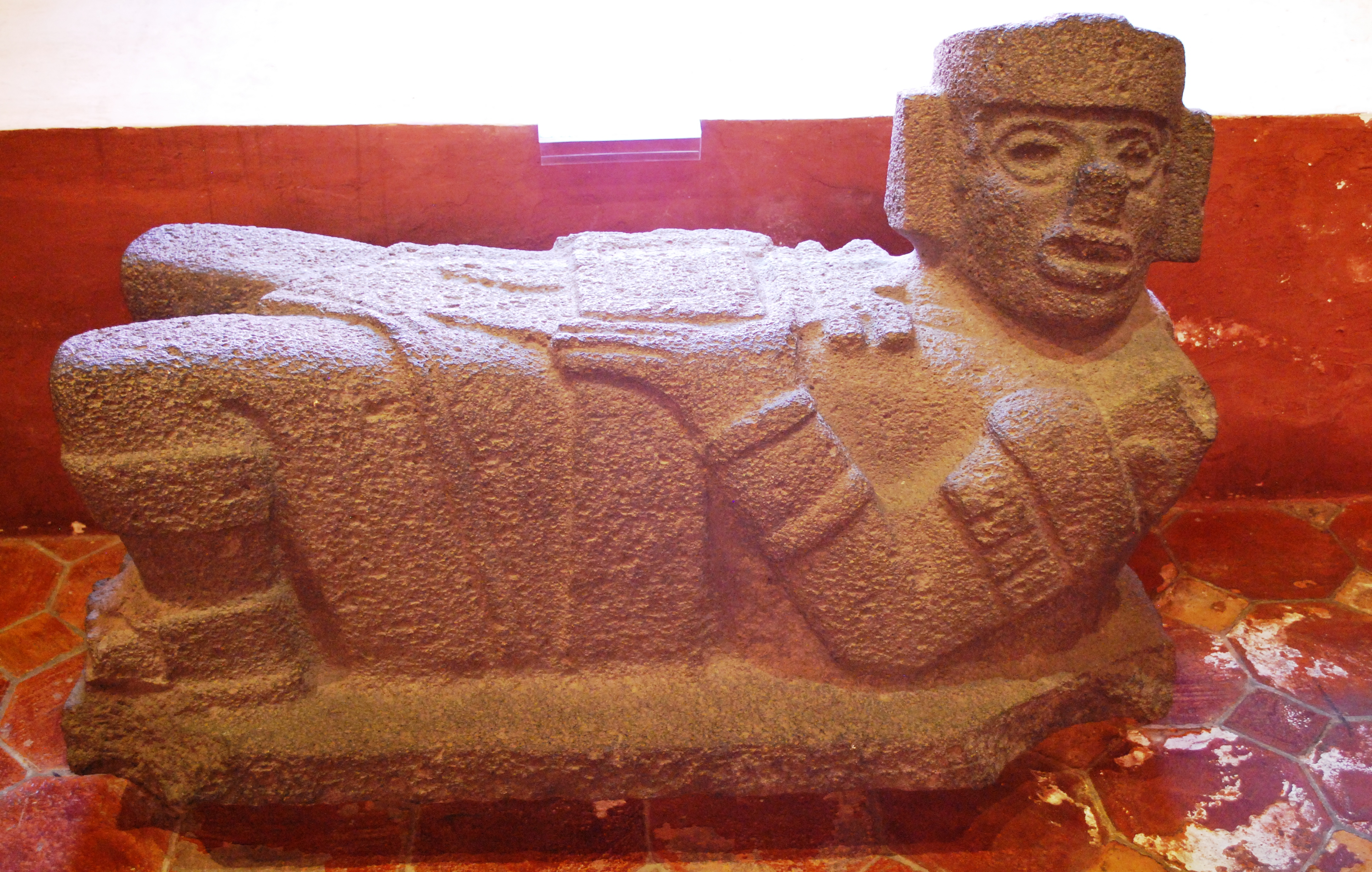
Chacmool from Tula.

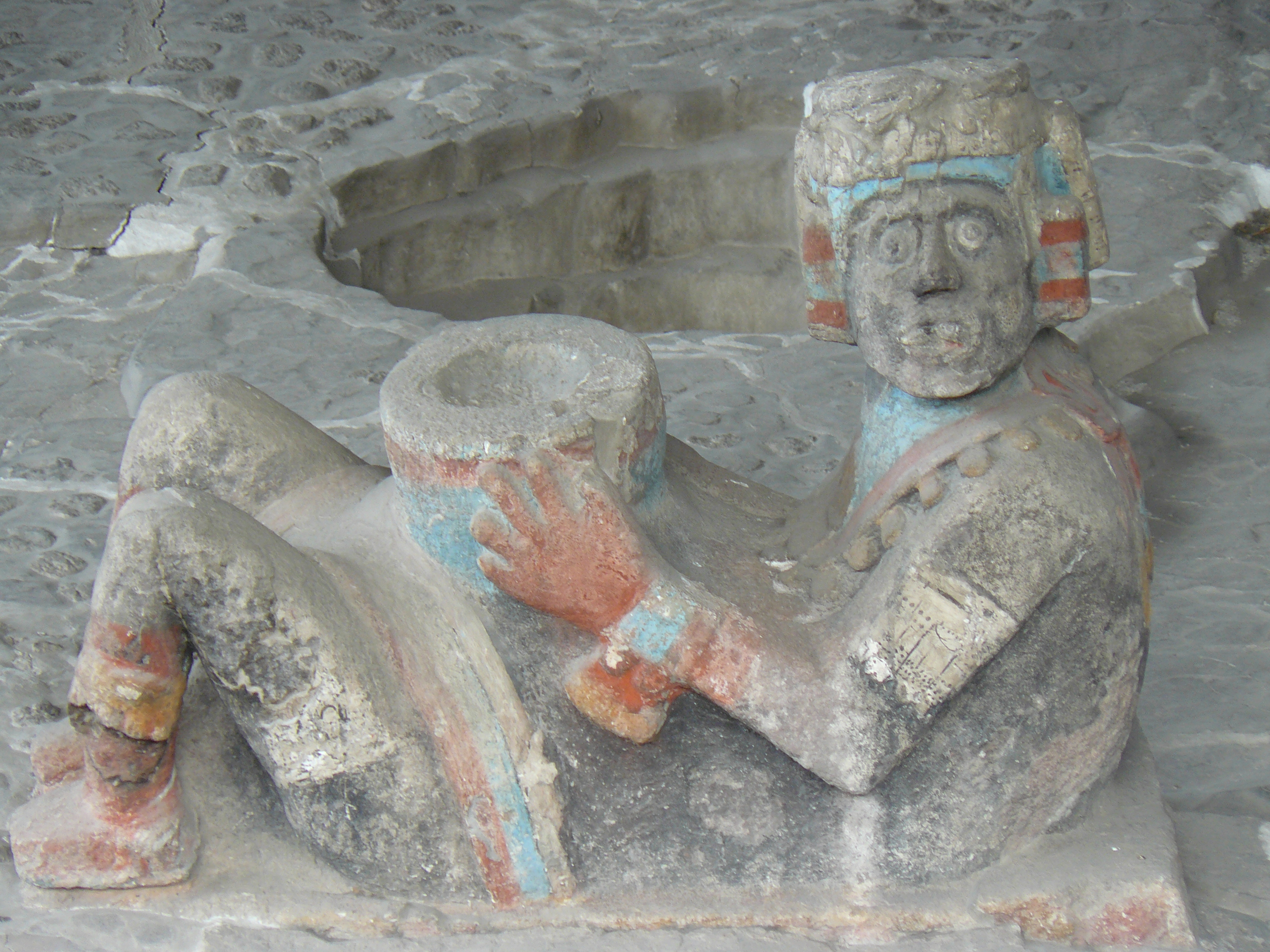
Chacmool from the Templo Mayor in Tenochtitlan.

In addition to copying the Atlantean figures from Tula, the Aztecs also copied the chacmools they found in Tula. Notice the similarities between the chacmool from Tula and the chacmool from Tenochtitlan. The Aztecs copied Toltec sculpture because they wanted to associate themselves with the great warrior nation that came before them.

==== Continuity or disjunction? ====
Richard Townsend has said that "the Aztecs drew on ancient artistic themes to associate themselves with the great traditions of Mesoamerican antiquary." In "State and Cosmos in the Art of Tenochtitlan", Townsend explores whether Aztec sculpture maintains continuity with or diverges from sculpture of the past. Townsend:

"The Mexica formed an art that would help to integrate their realm ideologically, and that would simultaneously serve to affirm the Mexica as legitimate successors to the great nations of the past."

Townsend explores the dichotomy between continuity and disjunction by comparing Aztec warrior figures to Toltec Atlantean figures. He argues the some Aztecs figures possess characteristics especially similar to those of the Atlanteans from Tula. For example, he identifies one figure whose body is more contained within a planar, monolithic space.The expression is less defined and the carved lines are less vivid. According to Townsend, this figure displays continuity. Townsend then observes another Aztec Atlantean figure that to him represents disjunction. The figure shows influence of more common Mexica style. Townsend points out greater detail, bold lines, deeper relief, and swelling of the face. By looking closely at specific Aztec Atlantean figures, Townsend proves that the Aztecs imitated Toltec Atlantean figures but also integrated their own style and traditions.

== Significance ==
=== Political ===
There is indication that Atlantean figures "express the rise of new kind of military order and associated types of behaviour ". Between A.D. 850 and A.D. 900, archaeological evidence in the form of an increased number of emblems found throughout Mesoamerica support the idea that there was a "shift in leadership from the traditional one of paramount lord supported by lesser nobles (reflected in the radial stable networks and outlying elite complexes) to one that recast these supporting groups in the form of military orders". Mesoamerican Atlantean figures are seen to be the representation of this shift in political thinking.

== See also ==
- Caryatid
- Maya stelae
