= Maya–Toltec controversy at Chichen Itza =

Academic controversy

Chichen Itza and Tula have numerous architectural similarities in a number of their constructions. This Toltec-Maya connection is widely considered powerful, unprecedented, and unique in Mesoamerica. Unlike most Maya sites, some of Chichen Itza's buildings have the traits of the Toltecs, a historically powerful indigenous group from modern-day Mexico. The explanation of these similarities is a point of controversy among the scholars of the Toltec and Maya fields. Certain historical records caused many early scholars of the region to assume that a Toltec invasion from Tula, Hidalgo, usually placed in the ninth or tenth centuries, was responsible for a new wave of Mexican-style Maya buildings after the rest of the buildings in Chichen Itza were built. Other historical accounts imply a migration from Tula to Chichen Itza. An account of the Tula records a ruler of the Toltecs travelling east, which, paired with another account of Chichen that records a ruler from the west coming and teaching the Maya of that city many things, supported a direct influence of the Toltecs on the Maya around 900–1000 A.D. However, recent radiocarbon dating suggests that Chichen Itza's ‘mexicanized’ and pure Maya constructions were built at the same time, and that both were built prior to any recorded Toltec invasion, and prior to the banishing of the semi-historical ruler. The precise connection between these two nations is unknown, and fiercely contested among scholars of Toltecs and Maya, but it is not disputed that no other counterparts to these two cities are found in the 800 mile distance between them. Established contradicting theories and a lack of information cause the precise relationship between Chichen Itza and Tula, Hidalgo to be fervently contested.

== Architectural and religious similarities of the two sites ==
=== Architectural ===
Tula, Hidalgo and Chichen Itza share numerous architectural similarities not found in other Maya or Toltec sites. The Temples of the Warriors, two corresponding buildings in each site, are of equivalent style, they both have pillars inscribed with warriors, and the warriors in Chichen Itza portray a possible invasion by Toltecs. This is evident by the blue jewelry worn by the warriors which indicates turquoise, a gem associated with the Toltecs and not the Maya. It is also evident by the Toltec back mirrors which are worn by the warriors at Chichen Itza and the image of the Toltec Xiuhtototl bird found on the headdresses of the Chichen Itza warriors. A nearby Chac Mool, or sacrificial altar, outside each of the temples confirms again a direct correlation between the two sites. There is also a large series of columns, which originally supported a tremendous enclosed space, surrounding the Temples of the Warriors in both of the two sites, and in other areas. A Castillo-mimicry in Tula, Hidalgo (now ruined) of the same construction in Chichen Itza, and the fact both sites have very large ballcourts set in a similar architectural context further cement the fact that there is some connection between Chichen and Tula. These bases of comparison are undisputed. However, the exact relationship between the two sites is unknown. This connection between the two sites is significant in part because Chichen Itza and Tula were both the seats of large Mesoamerican empires. That they share such constructions is unique and startling. No other Toltec or Maya site has an equivalent set of buildings in a different city, and in a different culture. This distinctive trait, and the huge historical power of each of these two sides, makes this argument a tremendous one in Mesoamerican studies.

=== Symbolism and religion ===
The religious iconography of Chichen Itza is abnormal for a Maya site. The numerous depictions of Quetzalcoatl, or feathered serpent deities, is more in line with Toltec belief than with that of the Maya. Though the Maya did worship the Feathered Serpent, it was typically much less common. There is also a greater persistence of weapons and shields in the Maya site than is typical.

== Early theories of the relationship ==
Since the European discovery of Chichen Itza and Tula, Hidalgo, it has been noted that there were peculiar similarities between certain constructions in Chichen Itza and in Tula Hidalgo. In particular, Tula Hidalgo has a similar Castillo pyramid as Chichen Itza, as well as an identical temple, the Temple of the Warriors. The re-discoverer of Chichen Itza noticed that there was a similarity between Tula and Chichen Itza, and although there was a little initial resistance to the idea, no major archeologists in the modern age have contested that there is not a strong, if mysterious, connection between Tula, Hidalgo and Chichen Itza.

Originally, there was a majority consensus that the Toltecs militarily exerted power over the Maya and conquered them. This caused a shift in their architectural style, which creates the Toltec-Maya incongruity within the construction of Chichen Itza. Usually it was assumed that the pure Maya constructions had been constructed prior to the ‘mexicanized,’ or Toltec-ized, buildings. Many theories were established explaining the precise nature of this connection by well-known scholars (of the time), but these early efforts were directly contradicted by later information.

=== Sylvanus Morley and Toltec Migration ===
Sylvanus G. Morley proposed that after the Maya buildings in Chichen Itza were constructed, the leaders of Chichen Itza, the Itza, abandoned Chichen Itza. After they abandoned Chichen, the Itza wandered for a time, found a renegade group of Toltecs led by Kukulcan, and subsumed them, learning new crafts and traditions in the process. The Itza, ruled by Kukulcan, then returned to Chichen Itza and constructed the ‘mexicanized’ sites of Chichen Itza, which were based on Tula Hidalgo's sites. By migration, the Toltecs supposedly became the kings of Chichen Itza, leading to similarities between the two sites.

=== Alfred M Tozzer and Three Conquests ===
Alfred M Tozzer, a very influential voice in the field of Maya during the early half of the twentieth century, proposed that the Maya at Chichen Itza were overcome by the Toltecs three times, which subverted their culture progressively. The first invasion supposedly was of Toltecs, and was led by the mythological figure Kukulcan. The second was an invasion of Toltec-ized Itza (the founding royal family of Chichen Itza) and was led by Kukulcan II. The Third invasion was of Mexican mercenaries from Tabasco. Tozzer argued that the Maya ruled between these three waves of violence and negative culture, and that this creates the dichotomy within Chichen Itza architecture. There is no strong evidence that there was a Toltec dominance of Chichen Itza outside of the buildings in question, and so Tozzer's work remains mainly within the boundary of speculation.

=== J Eric S. Thompson and Toltec Integration ===
J. Eric S. Thompson, who claimed that Tozzer's explanation “didn’t make sense,” had his own concept of how these things came about. The Itza Maya, he claimed, were powerful warriors and merchants that led Chichen Itza. Thompson proposed that they held a massive commercial empire and that when a Toltec ruler, Kukulcan, was taken in and supported by the Itza, it led Chichen Itza to become the center of a new Toltec empire. While there is some similarity in Thompson's theory to that of Morley's, his proposal placed more significance on the Itza than had been proposed before.

== New information ==
Evidence for the influence of Tula, Hidalgo upon Chichen Itza was mainly based upon the assumption that Tula was older than Chichen, and that Chichen's ‘mexicanized’ structures were built long after its Maya structures. Recent radiocarbon dating of the ceramics of Chichen Itza shed new light upon this subject, and invalidated many of the older arguments. First, it was learned that the ‘mexicanized’ and pure Maya sites had been constructed at the same time. Second, it was also learned that most of these sites were constructed before any recorded major Toltec influence occurred. And third, Chichen Itza's ‘mexicanized’ architecture seems to be older than the corresponding architecture of Tula, Hidalgo. The unanticipated results of the dating of Chichen Itza and Tula, Hidalgo cause many of the older theories explaining the similarities to be entirely discredited. More recent theories have incorporated age into their considerations.

== Modern day theories ==
There is no widely accepted theory for how Tula, Hidalgo came to mirror the Toltec architecture present in Chichen Itza. However, a few theories do present arguments that propose Chichen Itza's connection to the Toltec. The Chichen Itza Maya, who were the center of a great empire, traded with the Toltecs. It is known that the Chichen Itza did have trade networks extending into the present-day areas of New Mexico and Arizona, because of certain commodities present in Chichen that can only be found in these far-off regions. It is theorized that the Maya, envious of Toltec culture, came to adopt certain aspects of them into certain buildings, while maintaining some pure Maya construction. Another theory, similar to Sylvanus Morley's years earlier, is that the people of Chichen Itza were of two ethnicities: Toltec and Maya, and that this led to the duality of style within the site.

Rooted primarily in the seniority of Chichen Itza is a modern-day counterargument to the Tula Toltec's influence of the Maya of Chichen Itza. Because of the greater age of Chichen Itza, and the lack of direct evidence of Toltec control over Chichen, there is some argument that it was the Maya who were influencing the Toltecs. Despite the fairly concrete evidence of Chichen Itza's seniority, this theory is not widely accepted. This is due in large part because the architecture of the Temple of the Warriors and other areas are of Toltec style, not Maya style. Thus, even if Chichen Itza is a central influence for the construction Tula, and not the other way around, it can be argued that Chichen Itza was still originally affected by the Toltecs, even if there is no evidence to support that theory.

While these and other theories cannot be contradicted with known evidence, no evidence links the Toltecs and Chichen Itza prior to the construction of the buildings that are the source of this controversy.

== Problems with analyses of these sites ==
=== Limited information ===
The fall of Chichen Itza was approximately 800–1000 years ago. Because of this, information about Chichen Itza is mostly drawn through the analysis of its art and architecture. This, and the scarcity of texts prior to the Spanish conquest of Mesoamerica, lead to a dearth of information about Chichen Itza. The gaps in information that exist in the history both of Chichen and of Tula are often filled with speculative migrations, invasions, and other events. It is in large part because of this that no consensus can be drawn as to the reason for this connection. There are enough gaps in information that many different theories can ‘answer’ why there is this connection.

=== Problem of tourism ===
The more Chichen Itza has grown as a tourist attraction, the more that unfounded but popular theories concerning the Toltec influence have been entrenched. Entertaining stories that are not verifiable are common in the casual analysis of Chichen Itza.

== Extent of relationship ==
While the presence of a relationship is not under any dispute, the extent of the relationship between Chichen Itza and Tula is entirely unknown. While buildings in each of the two sites may have intense similarities, and seem unequivocally similar, this does not mean that each of the buildings in one site contained the same ritual significance as the other site's equivalent building. Not only the source of the relationship is in dispute, but its extent is equally unknown.

== Bibliography ==
- Maya history and Religion. J. Eric Thompson. University of Oklahoma press. May 1990.
- Chichen Itza and Its Cenote of Sacrifice: a Comparative Study of Contemporaneous Maya and Toltec. Alfred M Tozzer. 1957.
- The Business of Narrative at Tula: An Analysis of the Vestibule Frieze, Trade, and Ritual .Cynthia Kristan-Graham. Latin American Antiquity, Vol. 4, No. 1 (Mar., 1993), pp. 3–21. Published by: Society for American Archaeology
- The Historical Significance of the Murals in the Temple of the Warriors, Chichen Itza. Donald E. Wray. American Antiquity, Vol. 11, No. 1 (Jul., 1945), pp. 25–27. Published by: Society for American Archaeology
- A Re-examination of the Mesoamerican Chacmool. Mary Ellen Miller. The Art Bulletin, Vol. 67, No. 1 (Mar., 1985), pp. 7–17. Published by: College Art Association
- The Business of Narrative at Tula: An Analysis of the Vestibule Frieze, Trade, and Ritual. Cynthia Kristan-Graham. Latin American Antiquity, Vol. 4, No. 1 (Mar., 1993), pp. 3–21. Published by: Society for American Archaeology
- The Colonial Legacy in Ernesto Cardenal's Poetry: Images of Quetzalcoatl, Nezahualcoyotl, and the Aztecs. Jongsoo Lee. Hispania, Vol. 87, No. 1 (Mar., 2004), pp. 22–31. Published by: American Association of Teachers of Spanish and Portuguese
- Artistic Connections between the Chichen Itza Toltec and the Classic Maya. Robert L. Rands. American Antiquity, Vol. 19, No. 3 (Jan., 1954), pp. 281–282. Published by: Society for American Archaeology
- The Geographical Origin and Acculturation of Maya Advanced Civilization in Mesoamerica. Douglas T. Peck. Revista de Historia de América, No. 130 (Jan. – Jun., 2002), pp. 7–28 Published by: Pan American Institute of Geography and History
- Conquests of the Imagination: Maya-Mexican Polarity and the Story of Chichén Itzá. Lindsay Jones. American Anthropologist, New Series, Vol. 99, No. 2 (Jun., 1997), pp. 275–290 Published by: Blackwell Publishing on behalf of the American Anthropological Association
- Lowland to Highland Mexicanization Processes in Southern Mesoamerica. John W. Fox. American Antiquity, Vol. 45, No. 1 (Jan., 1980), pp. 43–54. Published by: Society for American Archaeology
- The Hermeneutics of Sacred Architecture: A Reassessment of the Similitude between Tula, Hidalgo and Chichen Itza. Lindsay Jones. History of Religions, Vol. 32, No. 3 (Feb., 1993), pp. 207–232. Published by: The University of Chicago Press
- The Hermeneutics of Sacred Architecture: A Reassessment of the Similitude between Tula, Hidalgo and Chichen Itza, Yucatán, Part II. Author(s): Lindsay Jones. Source: History of Religions, Vol. 32, No. 4 (May, 1993), pp. 315–342. Published by: The University of Chicago Press
- Serpent and Atlantean Columns: Symbols of Maya-Toltec Polity .George Kubler. The Journal of the Society of Architectural Historians, Vol. 41, No. 2 (May, 1982), pp. 93–115. Published by: Society of Architectural Historians
