= Toltecayotl =

Toltecayotl is a Nahuatl word derived from "tōltēcatl" which was used by the Nahuas to refer to the members of the Toltec civilization that preceded them in the basin of Mexico, as well as a generalized meaning of "artisan".

== Modern use ==
The introduction and dissemination of that title in the academic world is due to anthropologist Miguel León-Portilla who, in 1980, published a book titled Tōltēcayōtl, aspects of the Nahuatl culture.

León Portilla's interpretation of the concept of Toltecayotl is based on a set of principles that were collected in the Huēhuehtlahtōlli or 'book of the ancient words', which includes traditional parliaments preserved by oral tradition and other documents. The main are the following:

Be very careful to seek friendship from He who is everywhere and is invisible and impalpable. Be at peace with all; under no circumstances humiliate another person. Do not waste the time which has been granted to us in this world, neither day nor night, because time is very necessary.

— Bernardino de Sahagún, Suma Indiana

This way you shall become Toltec: If you acquire habit and custom to consult everything with your own heart.

— Andrés de Olmos, Huēhuehtlahtōlli

== Criticism of the use of the term ==
Toltequity is also the generic name given to the tōltēca knowledge, or knowledge left by the ancient inhabitants of Tollan-Xicocotitlan Tula ("Tollan-Xicocotitlan") (Hidalgo, Mexico). Not used in University environments, nor in archaeological analysis (see "Tōltēcayōtl, aspects of the Nahuatl culture" from Miguel León-Portilla, anthropologist and Mexican historian and leading authority in the field of thought and literature Nahuatl. Since 1988 he is emeritus researcher at the National Autonomous University of Mexico.)

The historical validity of toltequity as such tends to be controversial, historians do not even agree in the Toltec city which is known as such, Tula is usually considered (the settlement known as the "Chico") as the base around year 550, and is closely related to the Quetzalcoatl history, while there are four origins, all agree in that he was a King, son of Mixcōātl and Chimalma, and who later was worshipped as God, and later would become one of the main gods in the Anahuac. While the Toltec gave rise to the founding of a legendary city called Tula or Tōllan ("Tōl-+-tlan" = Capital, the name of the Toltec city itself was "Xicocotitlan").

== The Toltec sources ==
Toltec was a generic name applied to all inhabitants of Mesoamerica. Derived from the root tol-, which meant originally 'stem, Reed', which gave birth to the name of the city of Tula or "Tollan" ('(place with abundant) reeds') and due to the cultural tradition of the Toltec City (originally ' inhabitant of Tula') came to acquire the sense of 'educated person'. Toltec ideas received the name of tōltēcayōtl 'toltequity' and were made up of religious, artistic and scientific formulas that reflected the Mesoamerican cosmovision.

The definition of the Toltecs as a historical or ethnic group is a fact established by researchers in a round table in 1941. Currently, new age groups claim very disparate things to justify the native use of the term Toltec:

Toltecatl, mechanical arts craftsman. Toltecauia, making something for the teacher. Tōltēcayōtl, art of living.

— Nahuatl-Castilian vocabulary, Padre Molina, 1571

You shall be called the Toltec for having created ad formed us, oh Feathered Serpent

— Popol Vuh I.1

The Toltec is wise, is a fire, a torch, a thick torch that does not smoke. Makes wise others faces, makes them take a heart. Does not go above things: stops, reflects, observes.

— Codex Matritense

The Toltec is a mirror bored on both sides. His is the ink, the codices; He himself is writing and wisdom, path, accurate guide for others; leads people and things, and is an authority on human affairs

— Codex Matritense

The Toltec is careful; respects tradition, possesses the knowledge transmission and he teaches others, follows the truth. Makes us take a face and develop it, opens our ears, and enlightens us. He is teacher of teachers

— Codex Matritense

Currently, the term "Toltec" is used by various New Age groups and by neo-nagualism practitioners. On the other hand, groups who claim to rescue the national identity roots assert without proof, having recuperated the original use of the name, applying it to anyone who follows the Toltec life principles; these are not validated by the Popper's falsifiability principle

== Neo-Shamanism ==
The idea of neo-shamanism groups, derived from the author Carlos Castaneda, is summarized in that a lifestyle can be lived with respect for elders, to obtain knowledge and preserve it without harming others.

From the neo-shamanism movement point of view, Ken Eagle mentions in his book similar topics as Carlos Castaneda, with the exception that makes connection with elements of the army of United States (Rangers) rather than the term originally used by Castaneda, Stalkers. In the book the Toltec path also recounts situations that appear to be alien channels, which removes historical seriousness from the term.

Carlos Castaneda refers generically to the Toltec as "secret conservators" in his book The Second Ring of Power, and in recent years a movement has been created divided into two parts, on the one hand the books by Don Miguel Ruiz, that shows a series of ideas or moral principles, and on the other hand a series of courses New Age type, that advertises on the handling of a return to the roots.

== See also ==
- Anahuac
- Carlos Castaneda
- Cē Ácatl Tōpīltzin Quetzalcóātl
- Nagualism
- Quetzalcóātl
- Tōltēca
- Toltec (Castaneda)
