= Tula (Mesoamerican site) =

Archaeological site in Hidalgo, Mexico

- Tollan Xicocotitlan
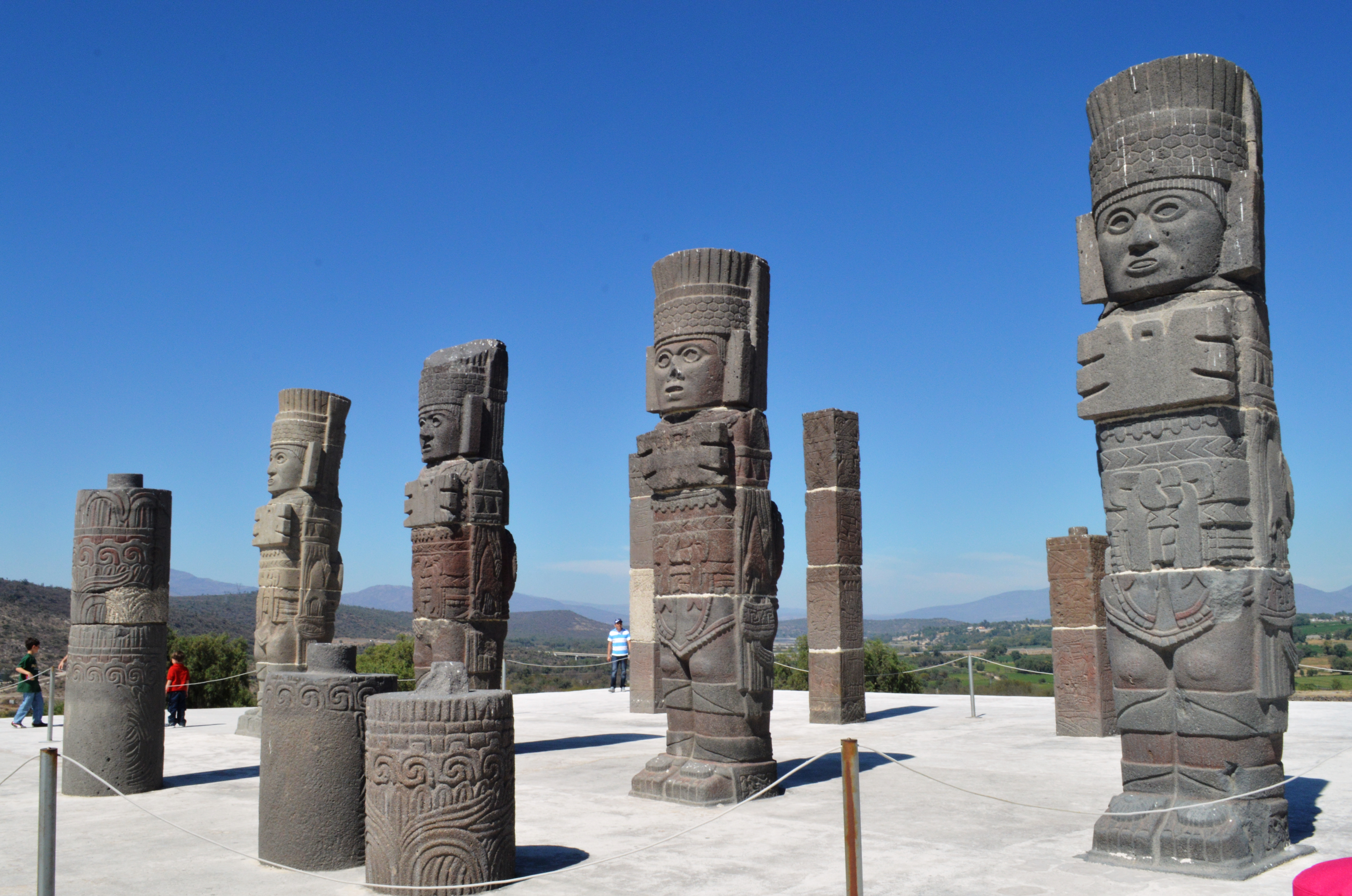
- Atlantean columns on Pyramid B in form of Toltec warriors.

- Location within Mesoamerica
- Interactive map of Tula
- 20°3′50.96″N 99°20′26.89″W
- Periods: Late Preclassic to Late Classic
- Location: Tula de Allende, Hidalgo, Mexico

History
- Founded: c. 700 AD
- Abandoned: c. 1150

Tula (Nahuatl: Tollan Xicocotitlan Otomi: Mämeni) is a Mesoamerican archaeological site, which was an important regional center that reached its height as the capital of the Toltec Empire between the fall of Teotihuacan and the rise of Tenochtitlan. It has not been well studied in comparison to these other two sites, and disputes remain as to its political system, area of influence and its relations with contemporary Mesoamerican cities, especially with Chichen Itza. The site is located in the city of Tula de Allende in the Tula Valley, in what is now the southwest of the Mexican state of Hidalgo, northwest of Mexico City. The archeological site consists of a museum, remains of an earlier settlement called Tula Chico as well as the main ceremonial site called Tula Grande. The main attraction is the Pyramid of Quetzalcoatl, which is topped by four 4-metre-high (13 ft) basalt columns carved in the shape of Toltec warriors. Tula fell around 1150, but it had significant influence in the following Aztec Empire, with its history written about heavily in myth. The feathered serpent god Quetzalcoatl is linked to this city, whose worship was widespread from central Mexico to Central America at the time the Spanish arrived.

== Archeological site ==
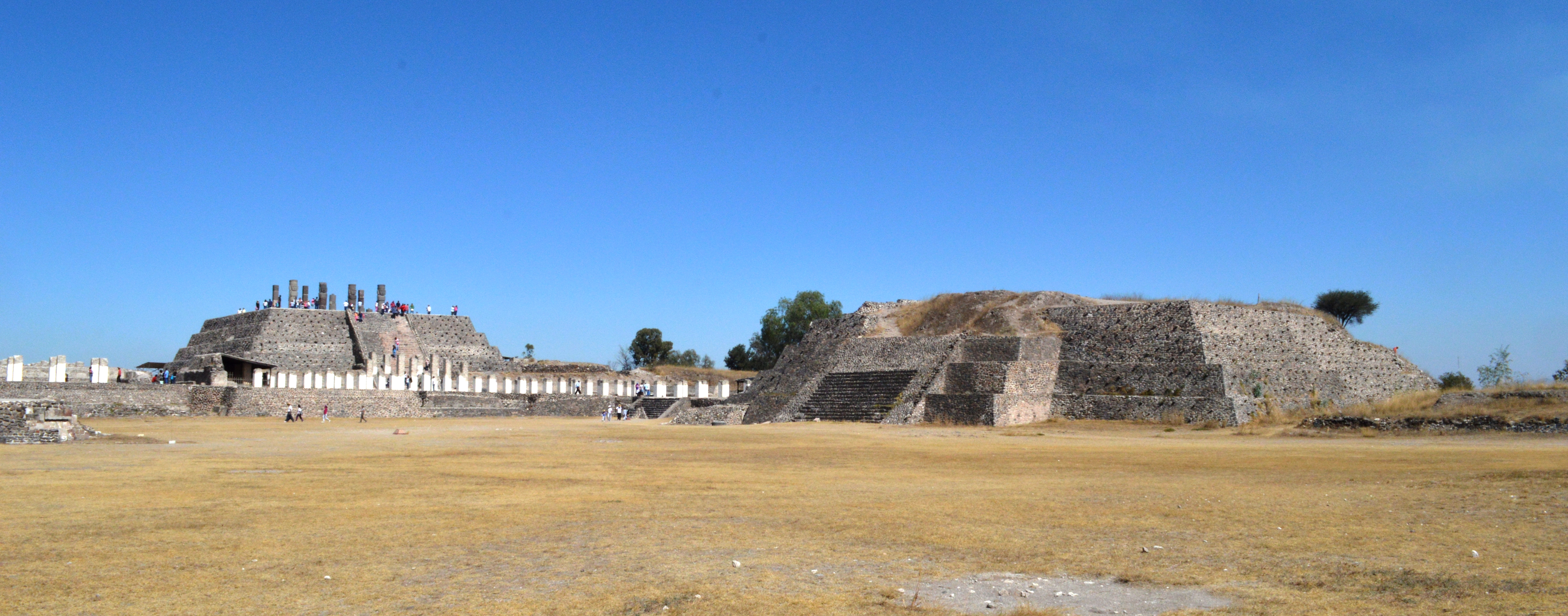
View of Pyramids B and C at Tula Grande

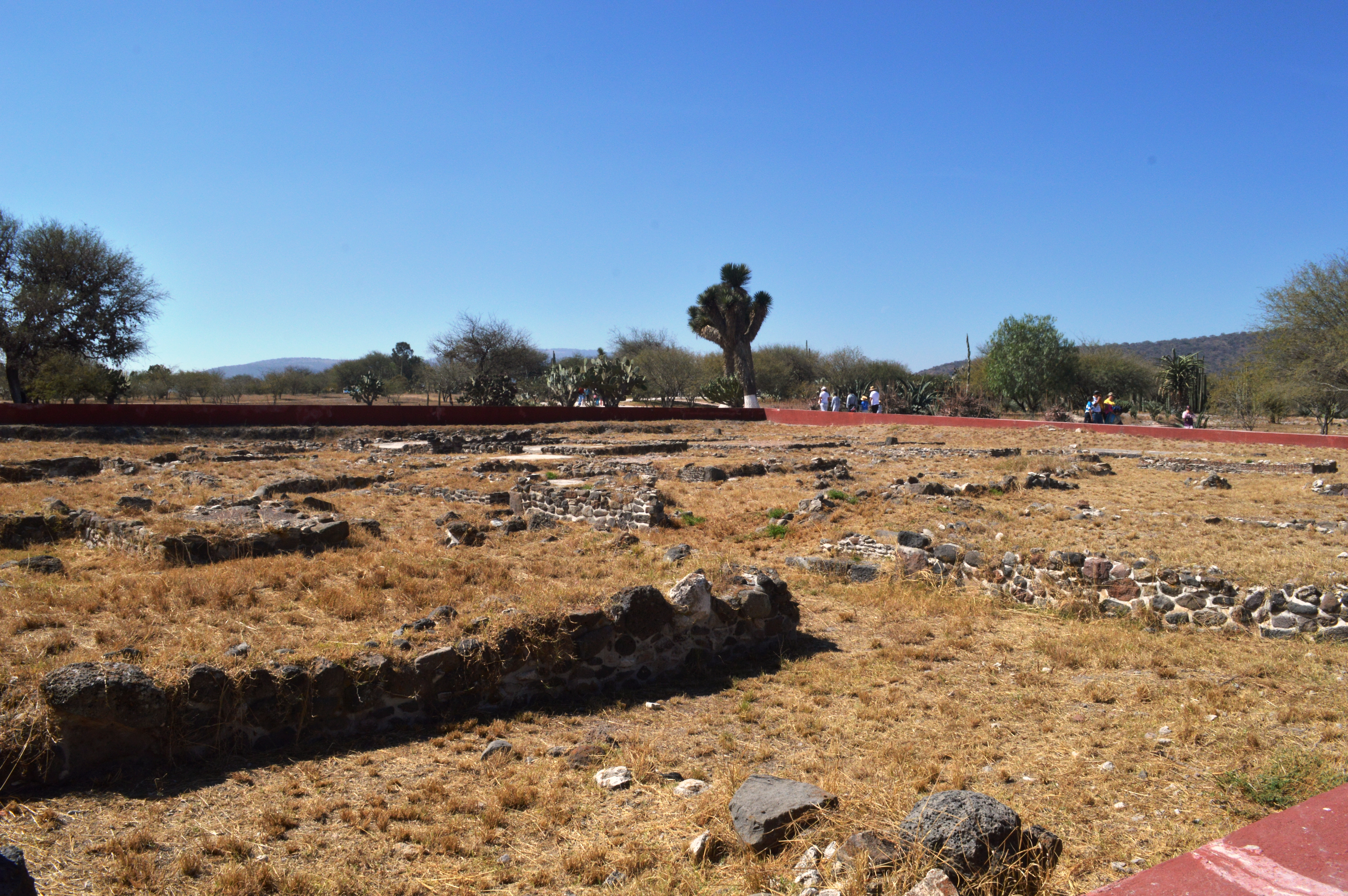
View of Tula Chico

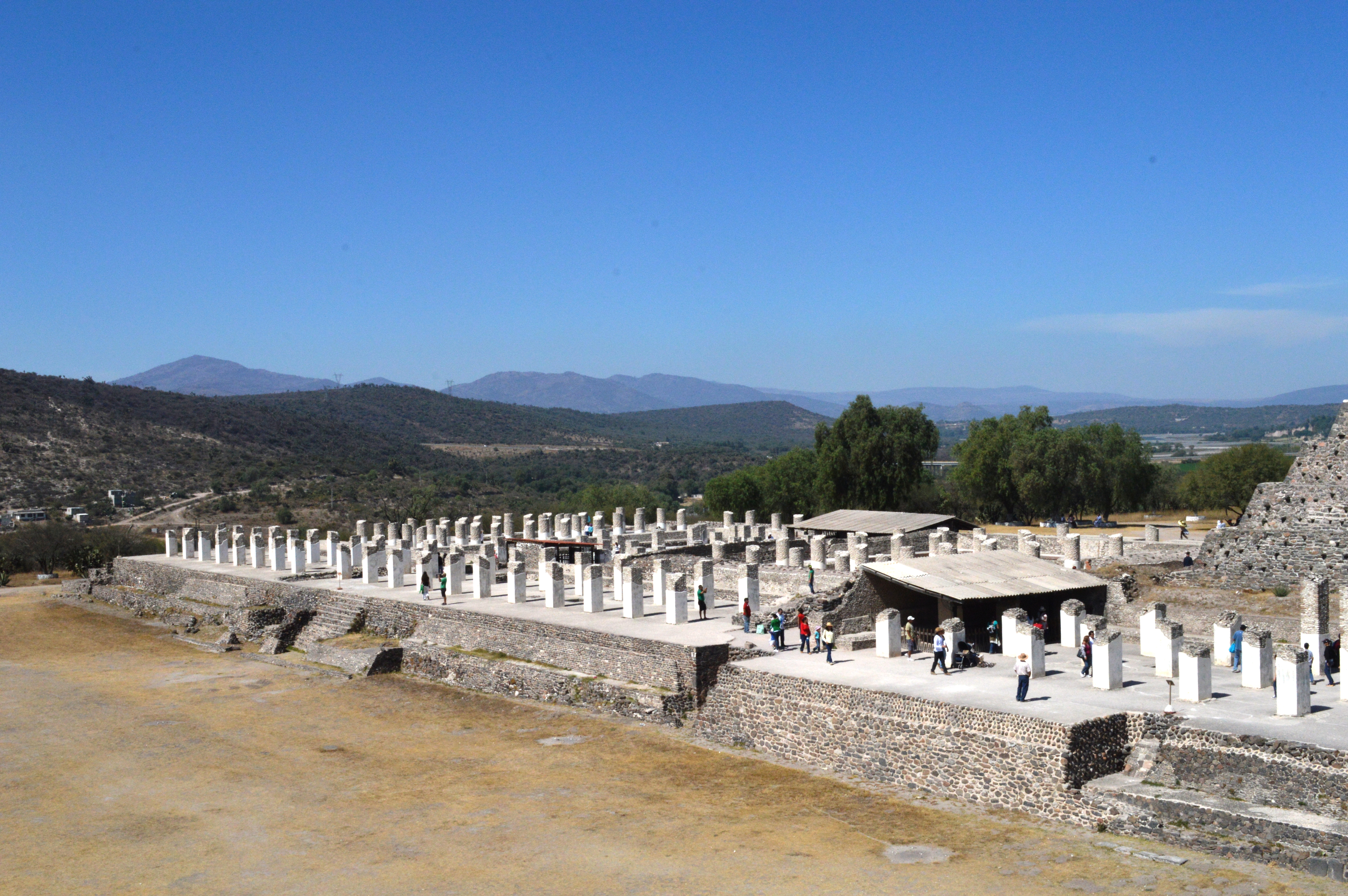
View of Building C, the Burnt Palace

The Tula site is important to the history of Mesoamerica, especially the central highlands of Mexico, but it is generally overshadowed by its predecessor Teotihuacan and one of its successors, Tenochtitlan. The name Tula is derived from the Nahuatl phrase Tollan Xicocotitlan, which means 'near the cattails'. However, the Aztecs applied the term Tollan to mean 'urban center', and it was also used to indicate other sites such as Teotihuacan, Cholula and Tenochtitlan. The inhabitants of Tula were called Toltecs, but that term was later broadened to mean an urban person, artisan or skilled worker. This was due to the high respect in which the indigenous peoples in the Valley of Mexico held the ancient civilization before the Spanish conquest of the Aztec Empire.

What remains of the ancient city is located in the southwest of what is now the state of Hidalgo, 75 km north of Mexico City. Geographically, it is in the Tula River Valley, at the south end of the Mesquite Valley in a region that indigenous records called Teotlapan (land of the gods). This area has an elevation of between 2000 and 2200 meters above sea level, with a semi-arid climate. It has only three continuously flowing rivers and streams, the largest of which is the Tula River. There are also a number of arroyos that flow during the rainy season.

The modern archeological site consists of the ceremonial center of Tula Grande, an area called Tula Chico, the Jorge R. Acosta site museum and the Guadalupe Mastache Orientation center. The museum is at the entrance to the site and is named after one of the archeologists who worked on the site for years. The interior is organized into various sections and contains sculpted stone works as well as human remains. The Orientation center also contains a number of archeological pieces as well as posters and more explaining the site's importance and relation to the rest of Mesoamerica.

The city is aligned at 17 degrees east of true north, similar to structures at Teotihuacan although the first village was aligned with true north between 700-900CE. The ceremonial center of the city is located on a limestone outcropping, with steep banks on three sides, making it defensible. War and sacrifice are prominent themes at the site with images representing warriors such as jaguars and coyotes as well as eagles eating human hearts. There are also images of serpents eating skeletal figures and skulls in various areas. The main structures of the ceremonial center include two pyramids, including with the atlas figures, two main Mesoamerican ballcourts and several large buildings, one with a series of columns which faced a large plaza. The main ceremonial area has a number of architectural innovations that indicate societal changes. The large central plaza has space for 100,000 people. On three sides, there are long meeting halls with ceilings supported by columns all facing the plaza with over 1000 meters of benches, which have stone reliefs depicting warriors and others in procession. The architecture indicates a change from rituals performed by only a few people in closed spaces to large ceremonies to be viewed by many. These ceremonies were dominated by warriors.

The major attraction of the site is Pyramid B also called the Pyramid of Quetzalcoatl or of the Morning Star. It is a five-tiered structure similar to the Temple of the Warriors at Chichen Itza. At the top of Pyramid B are four massive columns each carved in the likeness of Toltec warriors which once supported the roof of the temple on top of the pyramid. Each warrior figure is of basalt, four meters high, with an atlatl or spear thrower, incense, a butterfly shaped chest plate and a back plate in the shape of a solar disk. A large vestibule fronts the pyramid and connects it to nearby buildings. Today this vestibule and building (Building C) are a space filled with broken columns. Building C is better known as the Burnt Palace named after evidence that it was burned. This pyramid is also surrounded by the Coatepantli or serpent wall, which was later the inspiration for a similar structure in Tenochtitlan.

== History ==
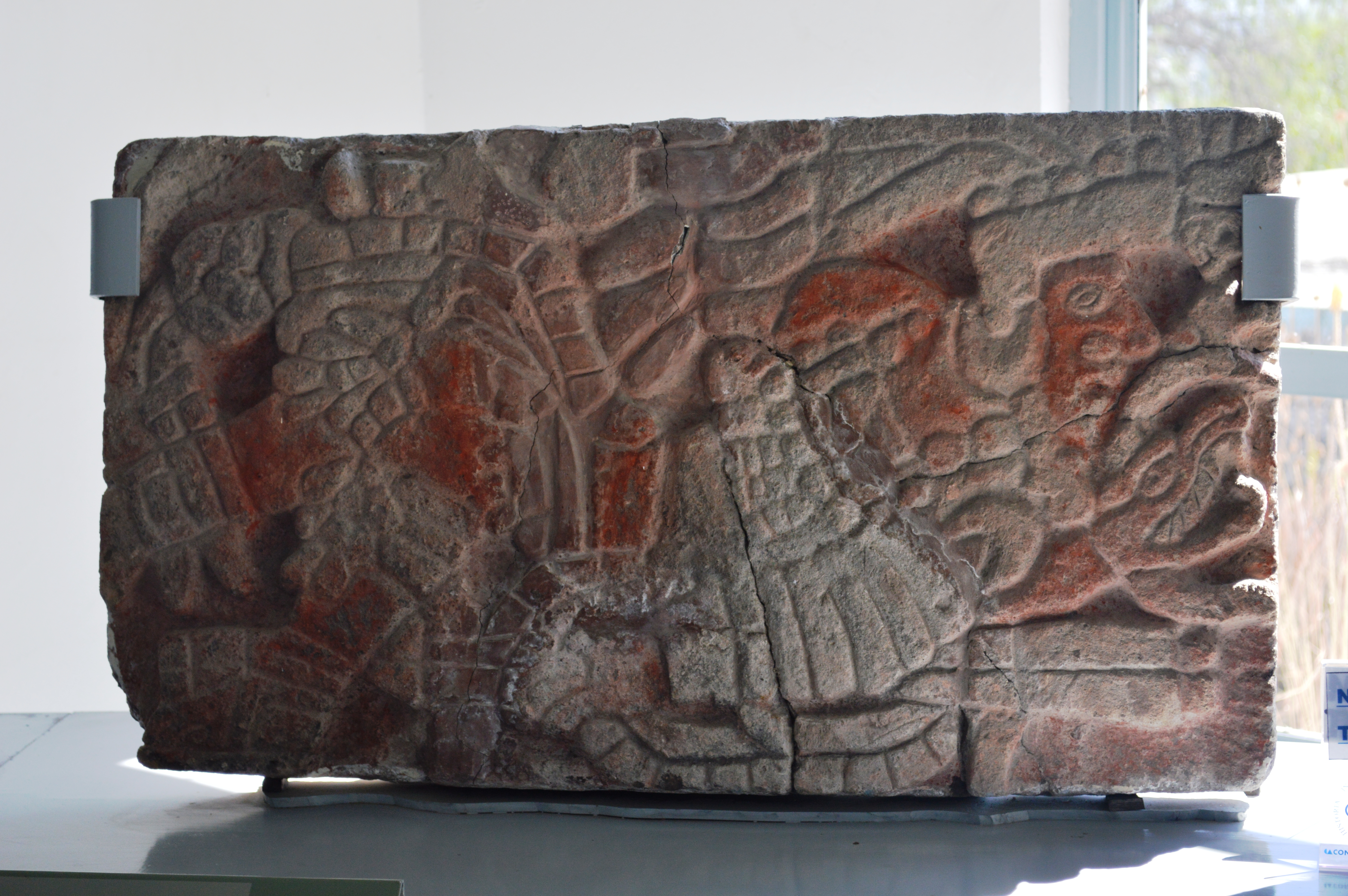
Relief of Toltec ruler at the Guadalupe Mastache Orientation center

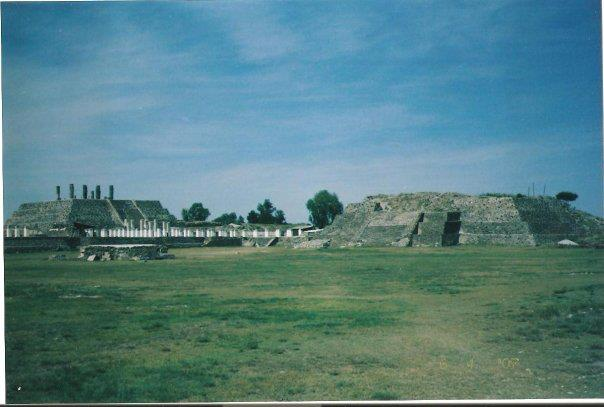
Looking from the western side of the ruins of Tula de Allende

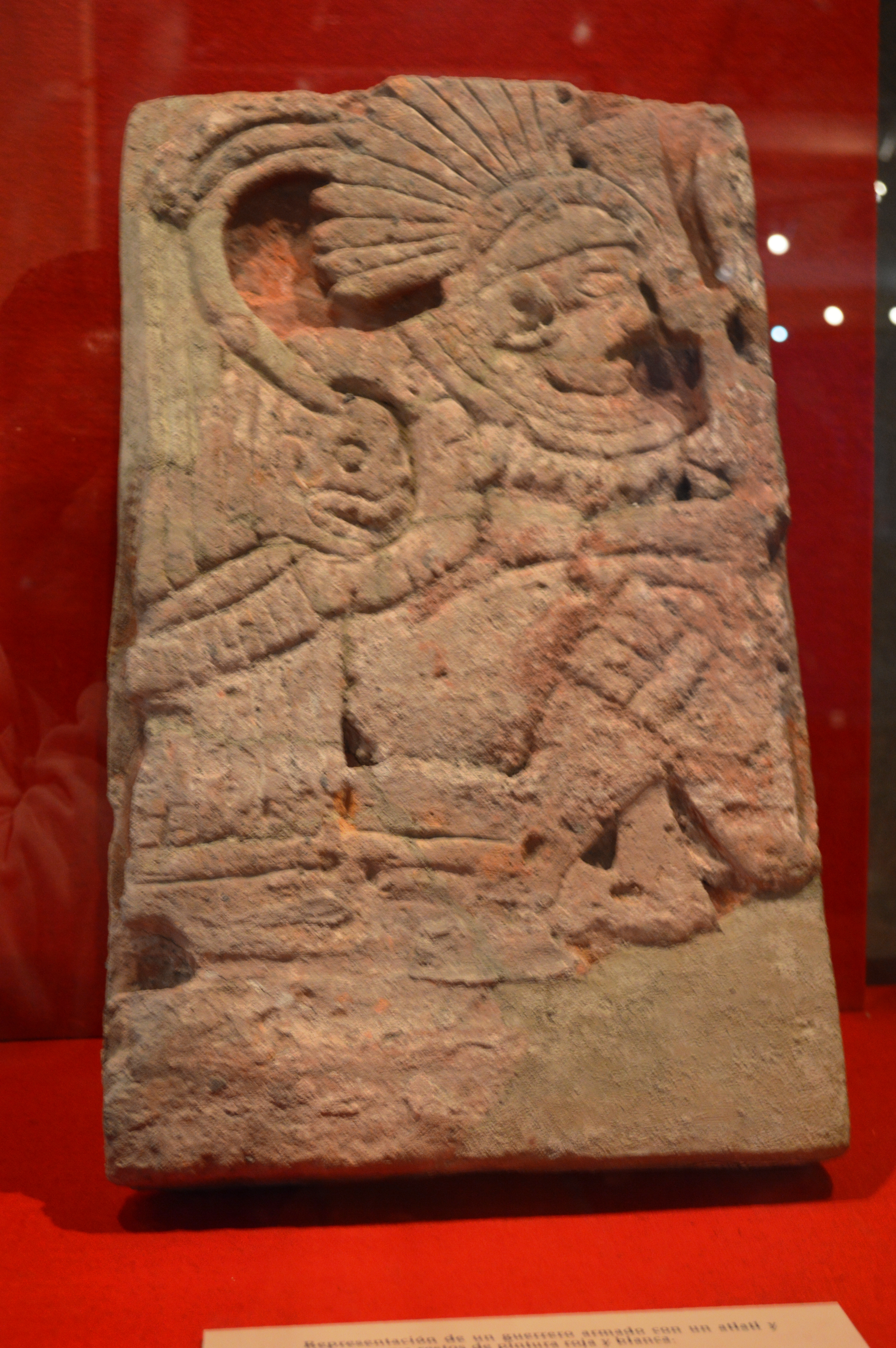
Relief of Toltec warrior with atlatl and darts

The earliest well-defined settlements in the Tula area appear around 400 BCE. Tula was probably settled by people of various ethnic backgrounds which may have included the Nonoalcas and the Chichimecas from the south and north respectively. The area probably was under the political control of Teotihuacan in the Epiclassic period, according to Teotihuacan designs found on Tula pottery. The area's lime deposits were probably an important source for the plaster used in construction. At this time Tula was a small urban settlement with modest public architecture concentrated at Tula Chico (Small Tula). The constructions at Tula Chico are smaller than those in other Epiclassic sites, and was probably a minor player in the political and economic activity of the time. Tula Chico's occupation is from 650 to 900. From 650 to 750, Tula Chico developed, and at its height spanned five to six km^{2}, parts of which may be buried under Tula Grande. The population was somewhere between 19,000 and 27,000 at its height. Tula Chico was abandoned between 850 and 900CE, and Tula Grande began to develop. After the decline of Teotihuacan, there was a power vacuum with city states dominating small regions. Tula ceramics change during this period, as styles and techniques come under new influences. At the same time, settlement patterns of the area significantly changed with occupation mostly on hilltops and high hillsides. Architecture and pottery show influence from the west and north, with some from the east, suggesting a multiethnic population.

The city rose to prominence after the fall of Teotihuacan and reached its height between 900 and 1150. Although Tula Grande (Big Tula) grew to be larger than anything contemporary with it, it never grew to the size of Teotihuacan. The city at its height probably covered 14 km^{2} with a population of about 60,000 with another 20,000 to 25,000 in the surrounding 1000 km^{2}, dominated by the ceremonial center of Tula Grande. Urban and rural house units indicated the importance of extended family groups but the scale of these seemed to have become smaller over time. Tula had defensive fortification at Las Ranas and Toluquilla against the Chichimecas. Its political sphere is thought to include most of the present state of Hidalgo, into the Valley of Mexico and possibly into the Toluca Valley and the Bajío. Much of this is done by comparison of ceramics but this can indicate political or economic influence.

At that time, Tula was a fertile region near obsidian mines and on an important trade route. Its economic base was agriculture and the mining and crafting of obsidian. It appears the craft was practiced by about half of the occupants, along with the working of travertine and ceramics, taking over this function from Teotihuacan. Tula probably did not rule an empire but may have ruled a regional state. Long range contacts are indicated by the appearance of ceramics from eastern Mesoamerica, grey-green plumbate from southern Guatemala and polychrome ceramics from Costa Rica. Tula probably traded obsidian in return. The socioeconomics of Tula society is thought to have consisted of a ruling elite class, a craftsmen class, a merchant class and a large number of farm workers. Most of the farm workers were outside Tula proper with most of the other classes in the city. Excavations in the area have found evidence of the cultivation of chili peppers, amaranth, squash and maguey along with corn and beans. A number of wild plants were harvested including mesquite beans and cactus fruit. There is evidence of domesticated turkey and dog. Irrigated corn was the most important crop with anywhere from 3000 to 10000 hectares cultivated. It may not have been enough to feed the large population. There is an unoccupied area varying from one to three km wide which was probably agricultural. It has been proposed that the area received more rainfall during the Classic period than now which may have allowed for more large scale agricultural production without irrigation.

It is probable that they had a form of hieroglyphic writing system, but no evidence exists except for an occasional glyph on a structure.

Tula did not last as long as other Mesoamerican dominions. Around 1000, there were problems created by the leaching of soil and the drying of the climate. This moved Chichimecas south from their drying homelands, creating ethnic strife, which eventually resulted in the city's collapse. Many of the living quarters appear to have been abandoned by 1150. It is not known when the ceremonial center fell, but it was burned, and the pyramids were destroyed. There is evidence of the ceremonial center being burned in the 12th century. Ethnohistoric sources mention other rulers and a king list was developed from them. The chronology dates the destruction of Tula to around 1179 while under the rule of Ce Acatl Topilitzin. However, this story has been disputed.

After the end of Tula, the site was looted, but it continued to be occupied through the rest of the Mesoamerican period and into the colonial period. According to Bernardino de Sahagún, craftspeople were still found in Tula at the time of the conquest, including scribes, stonecutters, masons, feather workers, potters and more.

The site was determined to be that of Tollan and the Toltecs after ethnographic studies and archeological work from the 1950s to the 1970s. However, Tula is not well understood, especially in its relation to its predecessor, Teotihuacan, and little has been published. No detailed archeological map of the city exists. Most studies have Tula remaining after the Epiclassic cities such as Teotihuacan collapsed, becoming the major power in the early post classic period, but some archeologists dispute this, putting its height earlier with the other cities. Several misconceptions about the site include that it has no system of avenues, was relatively poor, had no walled residential complexes and had only small mound clusters. It did have a grid system, but it had several major reorientations. Large residential complexes have been unearthed just outside the ceremonial center. The elite also had access to much of the finest handcrafted items then available in Mesoamerica. The size and nature of the city's political sphere is in dispute. There are no written records, and the archeological evidence is scant.

== Influence of Tula ==
There is evidence of Tula influence in other parts of Mesoamerica, mostly seen in pottery in Tula and in other areas. One of the most debated questions is what, if any, relationship there might be between Tula and Chichén Itzá far to the east in the Yucatán Peninsula. The idea comes from the fact that there are similarities in various art and architectural styles. It is certain that neither could have conquered the other, but there is evidence that they may have been connected through trade networks.

By the time of the Spanish conquest, Quetzalcoatl, the feathered serpent deity was widely worshipped from what is now central Mexico down into Central America. The god is linked to a legendary ruler of Tula, Ce Acatl Quetzacoatl, who was often simply referred to as Quetzalcoatl. Mythological accounts surrounding the fall of Tula have this ruler succumbing to temptation by a dark deity named Tezcatlipoca, causing the destruction of the city. The fallen ruler then wanders to the Gulf Coast, immolates himself, becoming the morning star (Venus).

The history of the city remained important up through the Aztec Empire and is reported in the codices written after the Spanish conquest. However, most of these stories are heavy in myth. These tend to start with the Toltecs and the city of Tula, followed by the migration of the Mexica to the Valley of Mexico. The stories either portray Tula as a kind of paradise in which the inhabitants master the sciences and arts or a city filled with strife headed for a downfall. In these the last ruler, Quetzalcoatl, is a legendary being with archetypical qualities.

Much of Toltec history was lost when Itzcoatl burned the history books after founding the Aztec Empire. The planning of Tula was adopted by some Aztec city-state rulers for their urban centers.

== Tula National Park ==
The archeological site was made a national park in 1981 by the Mexican government. The park covers an area of 1 km^{2}.

== See also ==
- Toltec
