= Toltec =

Pre-Columbian civilization in Tula, Hidalgo, Mexico

- Map of the Toltec culture (in dark green). Lighter green signifies their area of influence.
- Religion: Toltec religion
- Language: Nahuatl, Otomi
- Geographical range: Mesoamerica (historically)
- Period: Postclassic Period
- Dates: c. 950–1168 AD
- Major sites: Tollan-Xicocotitlan (capital), Huapalcalco
- Preceded by: Teotihuacan, Calakmul, Mezcala culture, Otomi, Chupícuaro, Coba, Chichen Itza, Puuc
- Followed by: League of Mayapan, Totonacapan, Azcapotzalco, Acolhua, Ecatepec, Chalco
- Cause of collapse: Arrival of Chichimec peoples who conquered Tula

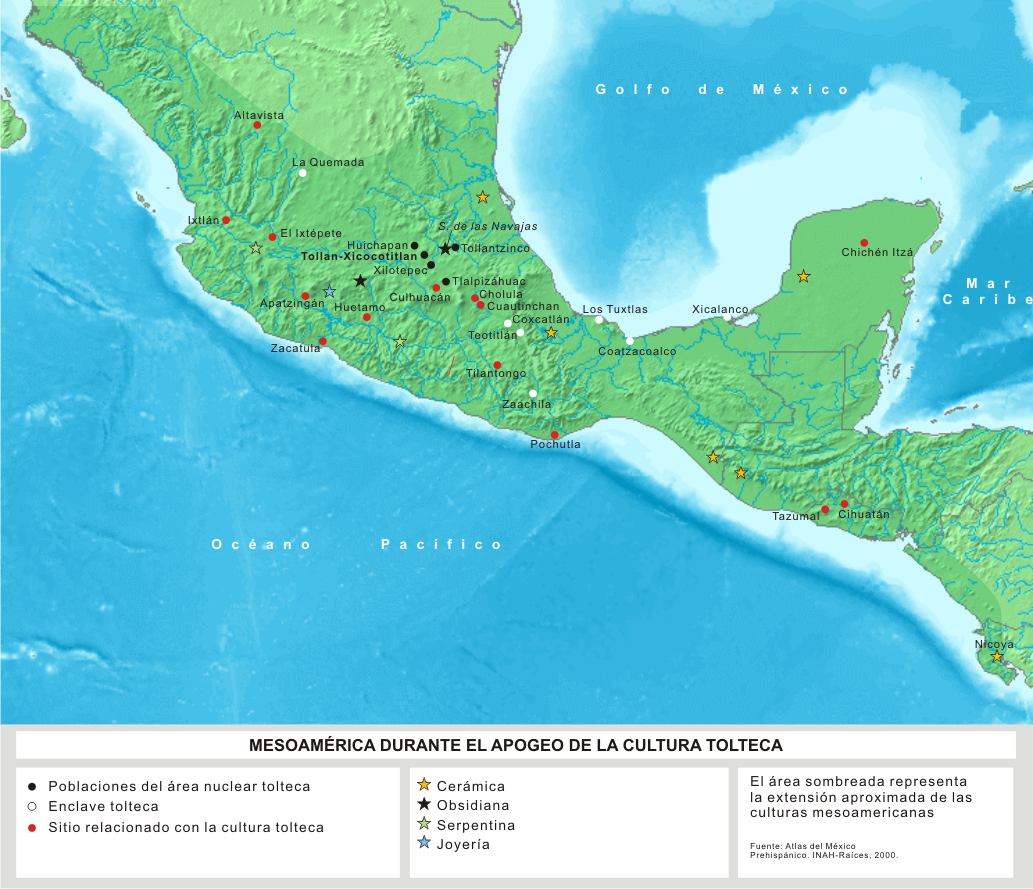
Important settlements of the Toltec period: cities in the Toltec heartland (black), Toltec enclaves outside the heartland (white), and locations with cultural ties to the Toltecs (red); stars mark major raw material deposits that were used at the time

The Toltec culture (/ˈtɒltɛk/) was a pre-Columbian Mesoamerican culture that ruled a state centered in Tula, Hidalgo, Mexico, during the Epiclassic and the early Post-Classic period of Mesoamerican chronology, reaching prominence from 950 to 1150 AD. The later Aztec culture considered the Toltec to be their intellectual and cultural predecessors and described Toltec culture emanating from Tōllān [ˈtoːlːãːn̥] (Nahuatl for Tula) as the epitome of civilization. In the Nahuatl language the word Tōltēkatl [toːɬˈteːkat͡ɬ] (singular) or Tōltēkah [toːɬˈteːkaḁ] (plural) came to take on the meaning "artisan". The Aztec oral and pictographic tradition also described the history of the Toltec Empire, giving lists of rulers and their exploits.

Modern scholars debate whether the Aztec narratives of Toltec history should be given credence as descriptions of actual historical events. While all scholars acknowledge that there is a large mythological part of the narrative, some maintain that, by using a critical comparative method, some level of historicity can be salvaged from the sources. Others maintain that continued analysis of the narratives as sources of factual history is futile and hinders access to learning about the culture of Tula.

Other controversies relating to the Toltec include the question of how best to understand the reasons behind the perceived similarities in architecture and iconography between the archaeological site of Tula and the Maya site of Chichén Itzá. Researchers are yet to reach a consensus in regard to the degree or direction of influence between these two sites.

== Origins of society at Tula ==
While the exact origins of the culture are unclear, it likely developed from a mixture of the Nonoalca people from the southern Gulf Coast and a group of sedentary Chichimeca from northern Mesoamerica. The former of these is believed to have composed the majority of the new culture and were influenced by the Mayan culture. During Teotihuacan's apogee in the Early Classic period, these people were tightly integrated into the political and economic systems of the state and formed large settlements in the Tula region, most notably Villagran and Chingu.

Beginning around 650 AD, the majority of these settlements were abandoned as a result of Teotihuacan's decline. The Coyotlatelco rose as the dominant culture in the region. It is with the Coyotlatelco that Tula, as it relates to the Toltec, was founded along with a number of hilltop communities.

Tula Chico, as the settlement is referred to during this phase, grew into a small regional state out of the consolidation of the surrounding Coyotlatelco sites. The settlement was roughly three to six square kilometers in size with a gridded urban plan and a relatively large population. The complexity of the main plaza was especially distinct from other Coyotlatelco sites in the area, as it had multiple ball courts and pyramids. The Toltec culture, as it is understood during its peak, can be tied directly to Tula Chico; after the site was burned and abandoned at the end of the Epiclassic period, Tula Grande was soon constructed bearing strong similarities 1.5 kilometers to the south. It is during the Early Postclassic period that Tula Grande and its associated Toltec culture would become the dominant force in the broader region.

== Archaeology ==
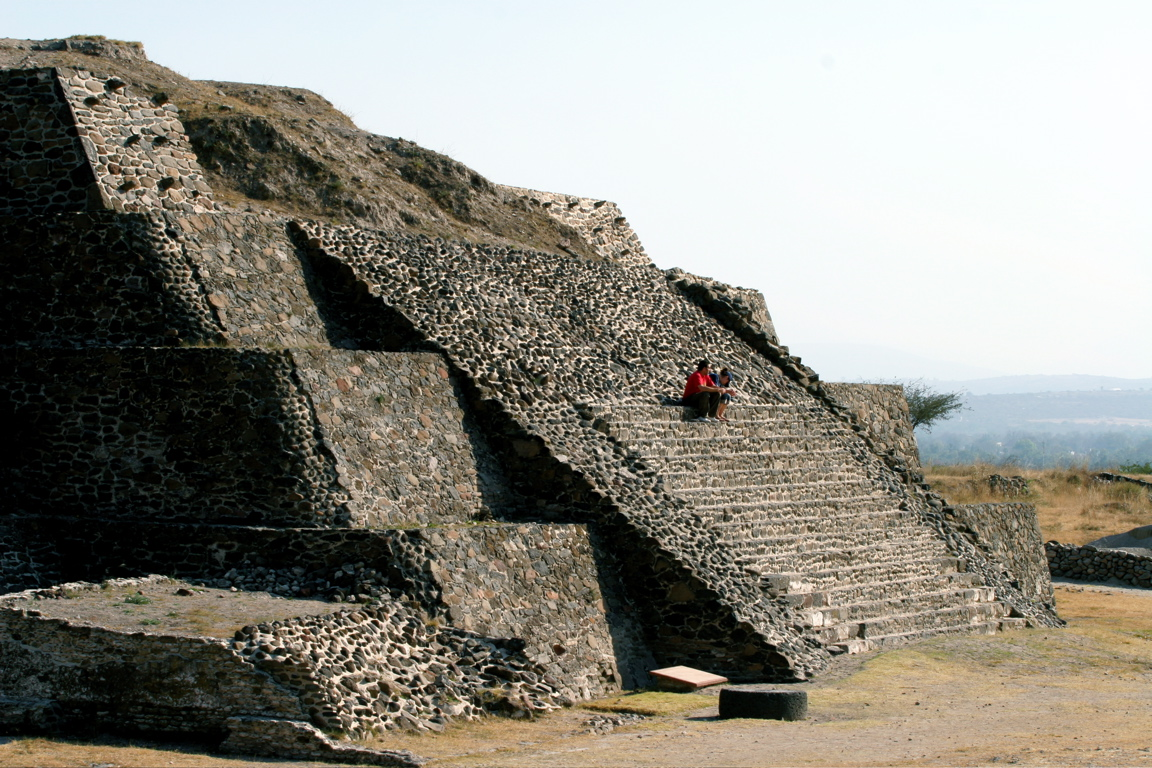
Pyramid C at Tula, Hidalgo

Some archaeologists, such as Richard Diehl, argue for the existence of a Toltec archaeological horizon characterized by certain stylistic traits associated with Tula, Hidalgo and extending to other cultures and polities in Mesoamerica. Traits associated with this horizon are include the Mixtec-Puebla style of iconography, Tohil plumbate ceramic ware, and Silho or X-Fine Orange Ware ceramics. The presence of stylistic traits associated with Tula in Chichén Itzá is also taken as evidence for a Toltec horizon. The nature of interaction between Tula and Chichén Itzá has been especially controversial, with scholars arguing for either military conquest of Chichén Itzá by the Toltec, Chichén Itzá establishing Tula as a colony, or only loose connections between the two. Whether the Mixteca-Puebla art style has any meaning is also disputed.

A contrary viewpoint is argued in a 2003 study by Michael E. Smith and Lisa Montiel, who compare the archaeological record related to Tula Hidalgo to those of the polities centered in Teotihuacan and Tenochtitlan. They conclude that relative to the influence exerted in Mesoamerica by Teotihuacan and Tenochtitlan, Tula's influence on other cultures was negligible and was probably not deserving of being defined as an empire, but more of a kingdom. While Tula does have the urban complexity expected of an imperial capital, its influence and dominance were not very far reaching. Evidence for Tula's participation in extensive trade networks has been uncovered; for example, the remains of a large obsidian workshop.

=== Material culture at Tula Grande ===
At its height, Tula Grande had an estimated population of as many as 60,000 and covered 16 square kilometers of hills, plains, valleys, and marsh. Some of the most prominent examples of the Toltec material culture at the site include pyramids, ball-courts, and the Atlantean figures on top of Pyramid B. Various civic buildings surrounding a central plaza are especially distinctive, as excavations show the use of columns inside these buildings and in surrounding colonnades. One of these buildings, known as Building 3, is argued to have been a symbolically powerful building for the Toltec due to its reference in architecture to the historic and mythic homes of the people's ancestors.

The physical layout of the broader plaza also partakes in referencing a shared past; its sunken colonnaded hall units are incredibly similar to those at cities of Tula's ancestral peoples. Importantly, these halls are known to have served as places to engage with both regional and long-distance trade networks and were possibly also used for diplomatic relations, suggesting that Tula Grande used these structures for a similar end. To that point, imported goods at Tula Grande shows that the Toltecs indeed interacted commercially with sites throughout Mesoamerica; shared ceramic and ritual figurine styles between Tula and regions such as Socunusco supplement this idea.

Additionally, surveys of Tula Grande have suggested the existence of an "extensive and highly specialized workshop-based obsidian industry," at the site that could have been one of the sources of the city's economic and political power, taking on Teotihuacan's previous role as the region's distributor. A survey done by Healan et al. recovered roughly 16,000 pieces of obsidian from the site's urban zone and over 25,000 from its surrounding residential areas. Tula's involvement in obsidian trade is also evidence for the city's interaction with another powerful city in the region, Chichén Itzá, as the vast majority of obsidian at both sites comes from the same two geological sources.

== History of research ==
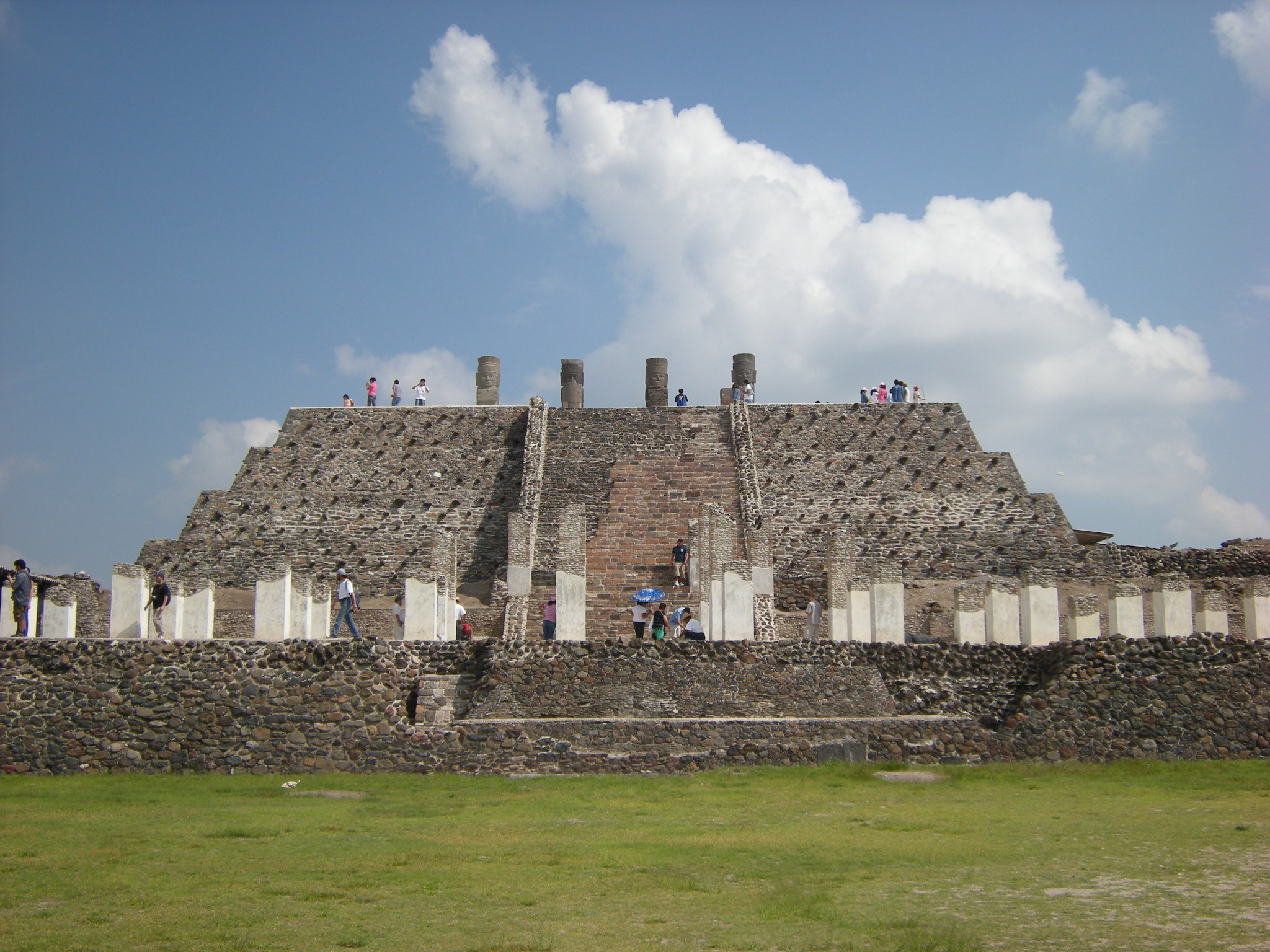
Temple of Tlahuizcalpantecuhtli (Pyramid B), the largest structure at the Tula archaeological site. The Atlantean figures are on its apex.

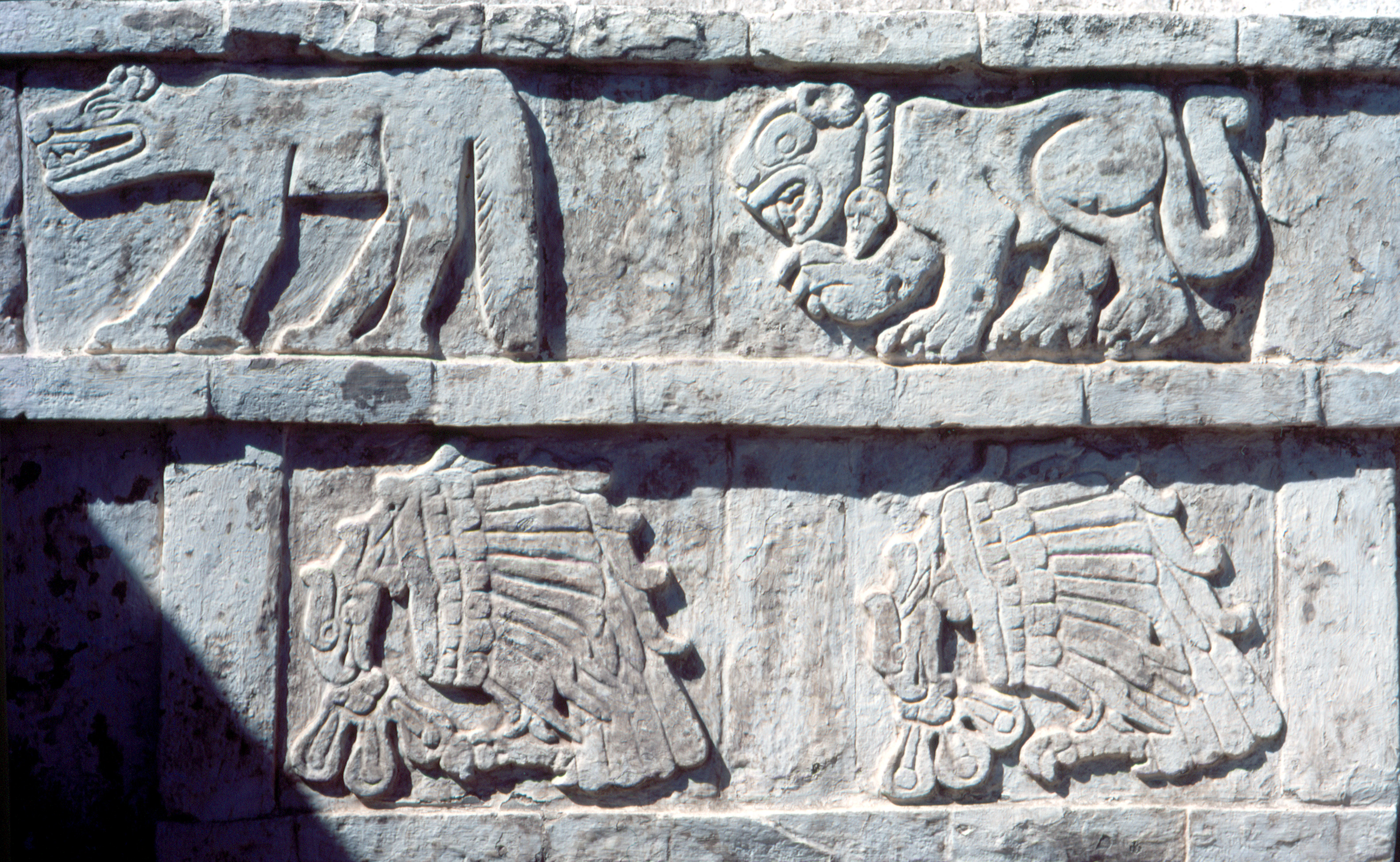
Stucco relief at Tula: coyotes, jaguars and eagles feast on human hearts.

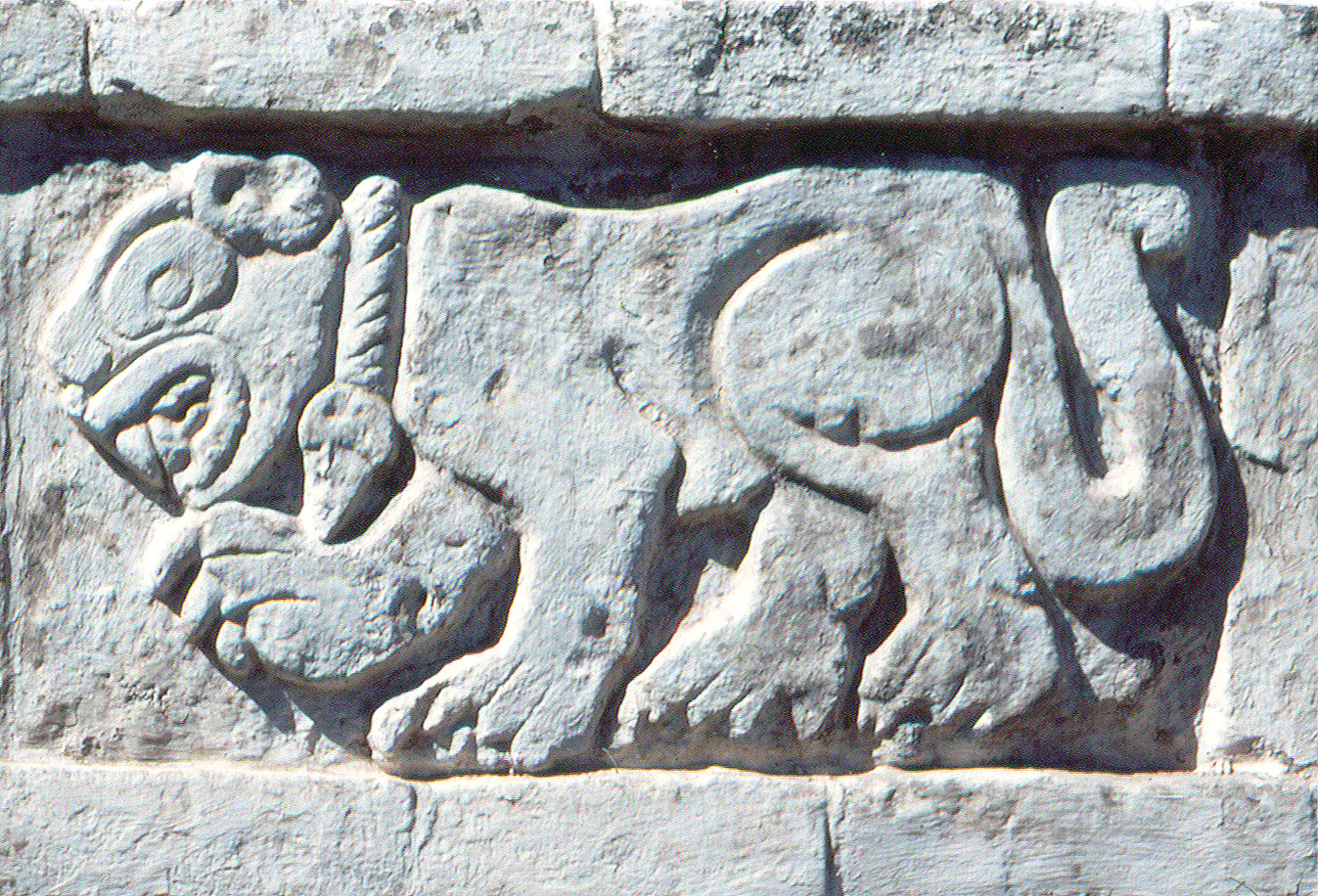
Carved relief of a jaguar at Tula

One of the earliest historical mentions of Toltecs was in the 16th century by the Dominican friar Diego Durán, who was best known for being one of the first westerners to study the history of Mesoamerica. Durán's work remains relevant to Mesoamerican societies, and based on his findings Durán claims that the Toltecs were disciples of the "High Priest Topiltzin." Topiltzin and his disciples were said to have preached and performed miracles. "Astonished, the people called these men Toltecs," which Duran says, "means Masters, or Men Wise in Some Craft." Durán speculated that this Topilzin may have been the Thomas the Apostle sent to preach the Christian Gospel among the "Indians", although he provides nothing more than circumstantial evidence of any contact between the hemispheres.

The later debate about the nature of the Toltec culture goes back to the late 19th century. Mesoamericanist scholars such as Mariano Veytia, Manuel Orozco y Berra, Charles Etienne Brasseur de Bourbourg, and Francisco Clavigero all read the Aztec chronicles and believed them to be realistic historic descriptions of a pan-Mesoamerican empire based at Tula, Hidalgo. This historicist view was first challenged by Daniel Garrison Brinton who argued that the "Toltecs" as described in the Aztec sources were merely one of several Nahuatl-speaking city-states in the Postclassic period, and not a particularly influential one at that. He attributed the Aztec view of the Toltecs to the "tendency of the human mind to glorify the good old days" and the confounding of the place of Tollan with the myth of the struggle between Quetzalcoatl and Tezcatlipoca. Désiré Charnay, the first archaeologist to work at Tula, Hidalgo, defended the historicist views based on his impression of the Toltec capital, and was the first to note similarities in architectural styles between Tula and Chichén Itza. This led him to posit the theory that Chichén Itzá had been violently taken over by a Toltec military force under the leadership of Kukulcan. Following Charnay the term Toltec has since been associated with the influx of certain Central Mexican cultural traits into the Maya sphere of dominance that took place in the late Classic and early Postclassic periods; the Postclassic Mayan civilizations of Chichén Itzá, Mayapán and the Guatemalan highlands have been referred to as "Toltecized" or "Mexicanized" Mayas.

The historicist school of thought persisted well into the 20th century, represented in the works of scholars such as David Carrasco, Miguel León-Portilla, Nigel Davies and H. B. Nicholson, which all held the Toltecs to have been an actual ethnic group. This school of thought connected the "Toltecs" to the archaeological site of Tula, which was taken to be the Tollan of Aztec myth. This tradition assumes that much of central Mexico was dominated by a Toltec Empire between the 10th and 12th century AD. The Aztecs referred to several Mexican city states as Tollan, "Place of Reeds", such as "Tollan Cholollan". Archaeologist Laurette Séjourné, followed by the historian Enrique Florescano, have argued that the "original" Tollan was probably Teotihuacán. Florescano adds that the Mayan sources refer to Chichén Itzá when talking about the mythical place Zuyua (Tollan).

Many historicists such as H. B. Nicholson (2001 (1957)) and Nigel Davies (1977) were fully aware that the Aztec chronicles were a mixture of mythical and historical accounts; this led them to try to separate the two by applying a comparative approach to the varying Aztec narratives. For example, they seek to discern between the deity Quetzalcoatl and a Toltec ruler often referred to as Topiltzin Ce Acatl Quetzalcoatl.

=== Toltecs as myth ===
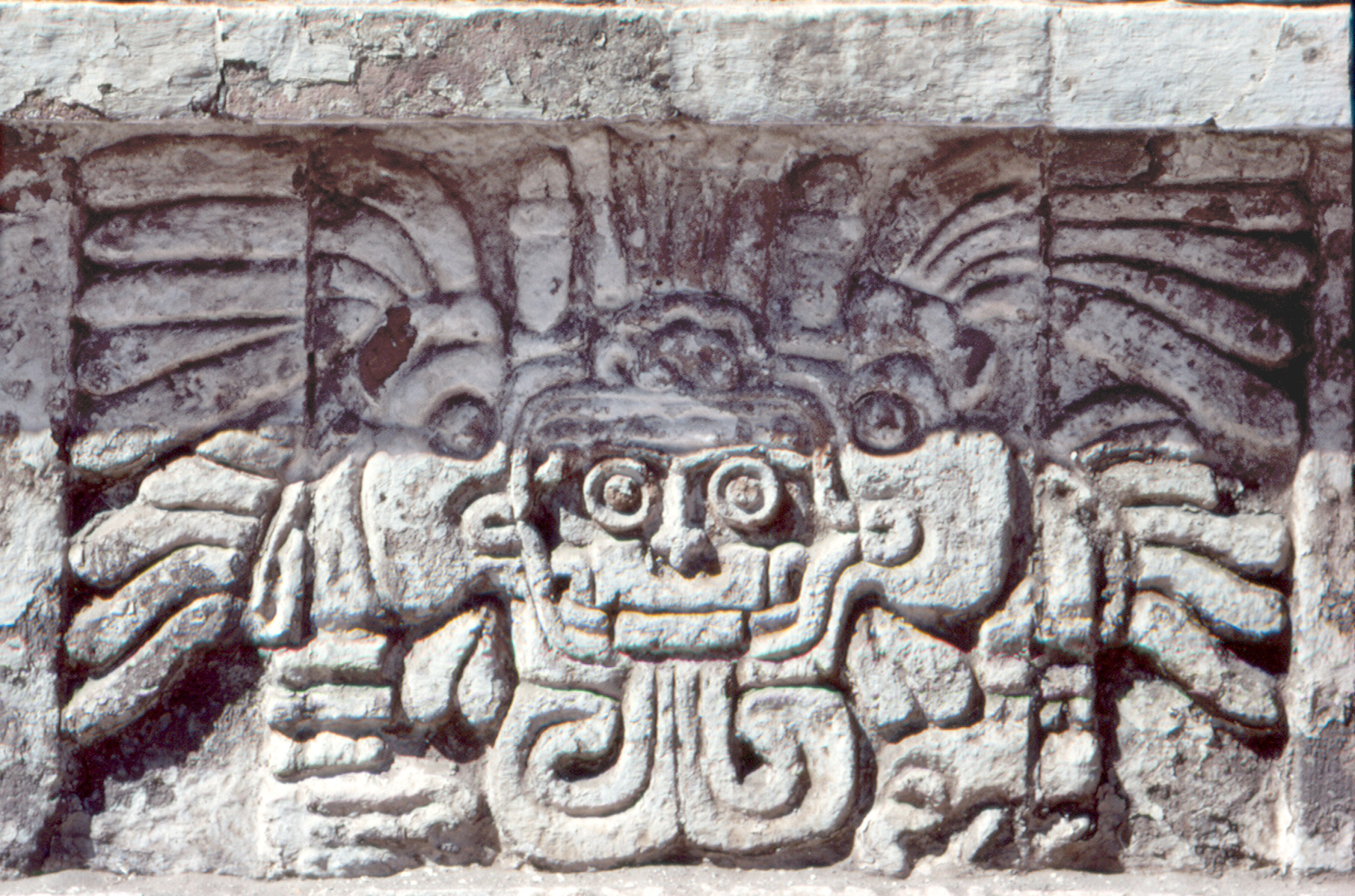
Depiction of an anthropomorphic bird-snake deity, probably Quetzalcoatl at the Temple of Tlahuizcalpantecuhtli at Tula, Hidalgo

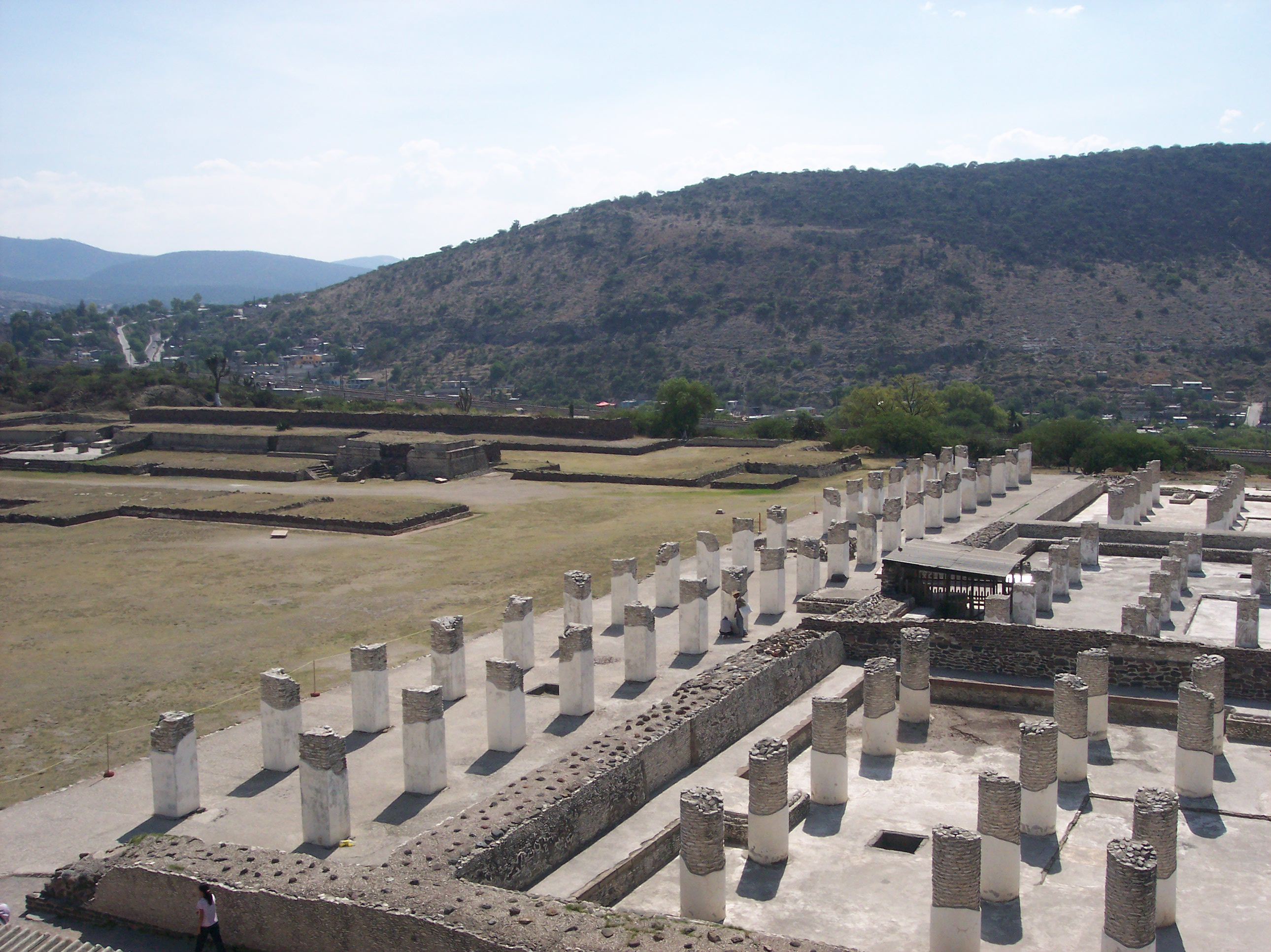
View of the columns of the burned palace at Tula Hidalgo. The second ballcourt is in the background.

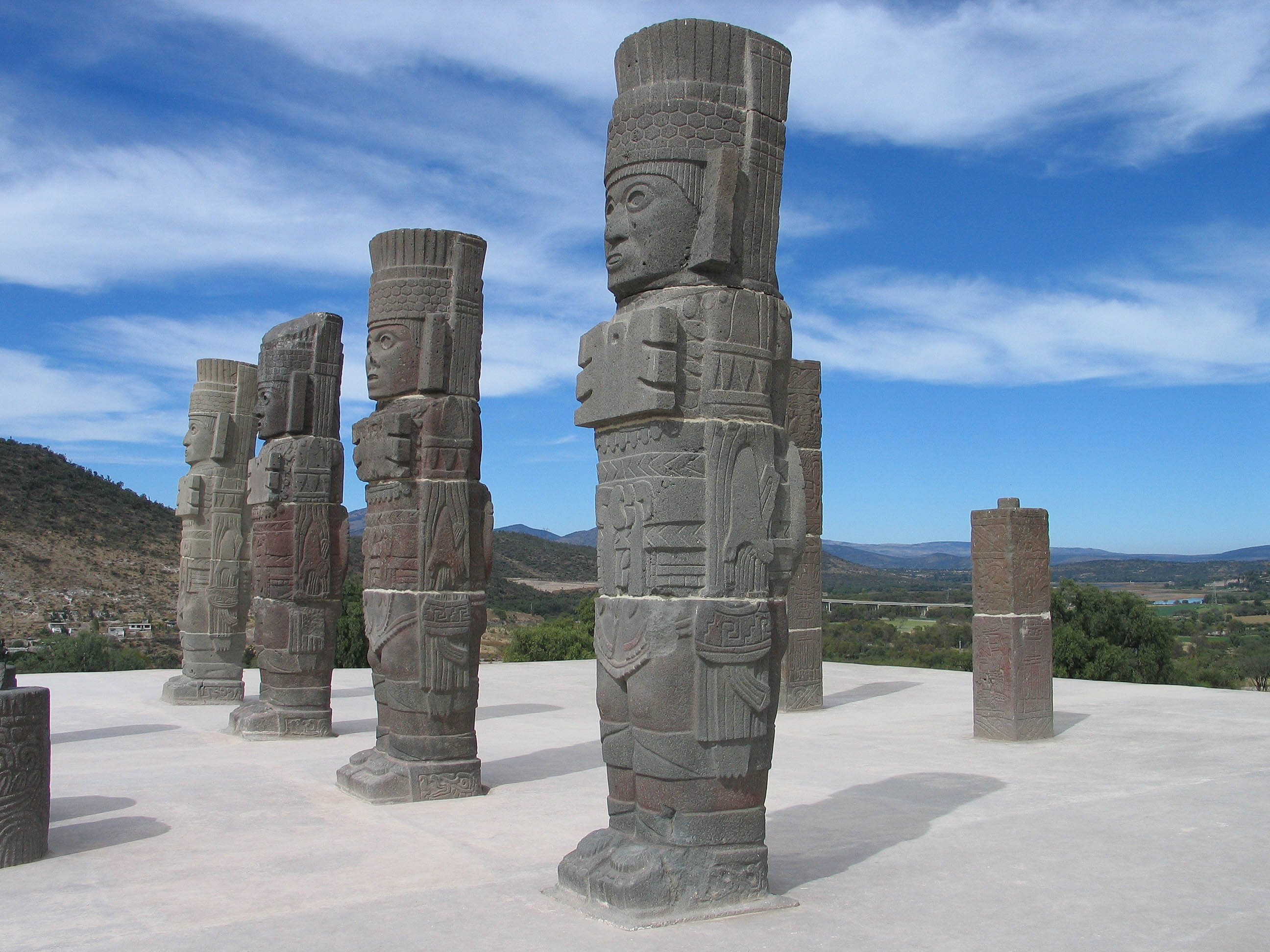
Toltec warriors represented by the famous Atlantean figures in Tula.

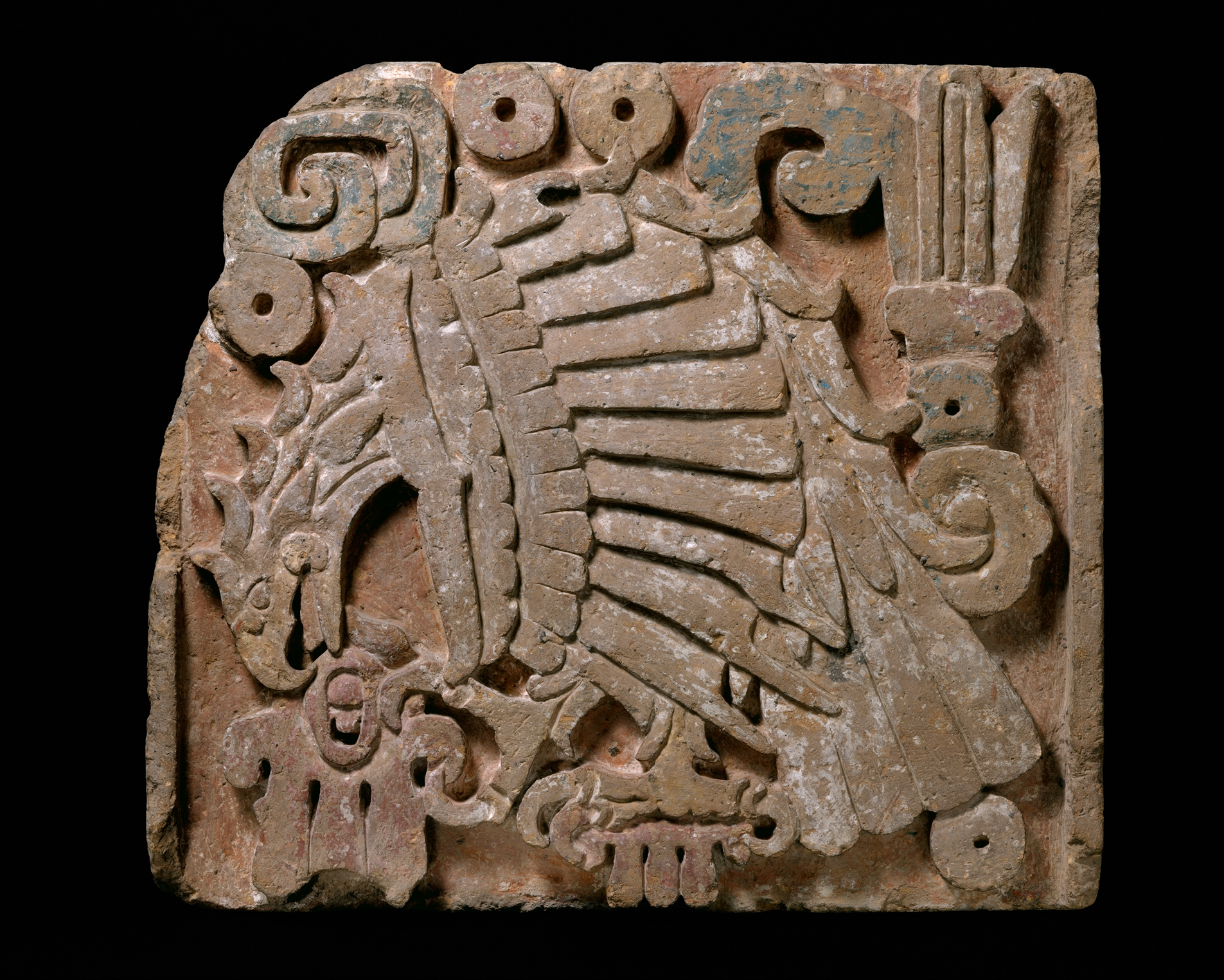
Toltec carving representing the Aztec eagle, found in Veracruz, 10th–13th century. Metropolitan Museum of Art.

Since the 1990s, the historicist position has fallen out of favor for a more critical and interpretive approach to the historicity of the Aztec mythical accounts based on the original approach of Brinton. This approach applies a different understanding of the word Toltec to the interpretation of the Aztec sources, interpreting it as largely a mythical and philosophical construct by either the Aztecs or Mesoamericans generally that served to symbolize the might and sophistication of several civilizations during the Mesoamerican Postclassic period. The Nahuatl word for 'Toltec', for example, can mean 'master artisan' as well as 'inhabitant of Tula, Hidalgo', and the word Tollan (known as Tula in modern times) can refer specifically to Tula, Hidalgo, or more generally to all great cities through meaning 'place of the reeds'.

Much of the questioning surrounding these Aztec narratives arises from the lack of archaeological evidence to support them. Aztec accounts state that the Toltec discovered medicine, designed the calendar system, and created the Nahuatl language. More broadly, the Aztecs attributed many of their societal achievements to the Toltec and their city, Tollan, which was idolized as the epitome of state civilization and had a substantial influence in the surrounding region. However, Tula—the site attributed to this Tollan—lacks much of the splendor described by the Aztecs. For example, Tula was primarily constructed from relatively soft and unimpressive adobe brick. While Tula was indeed a major regional city in its time, it was small both in population and influence compared to its predecessor, Teotihuacan, and its Aztec descendant, Tenochtitlan. Additional material remains at Tula, such as the destruction of Toltec buildings and monumental art coinciding with the arrival of Aztec ceramics, suggest that the Aztecs' reverence of the Toltec might have been mostly propagandistic, intentionally overexaggerating the previous culture to use it as a steppingstone for their own.

Scholars such as Michel Graulich (2002) and Susan D. Gillespie (1989) maintained that the difficulties in salvaging historic data from the Aztec accounts of Toltec history are too great to overcome. For example, there are two supposed Toltec rulers identified with Quetzalcoatl: the first ruler and founder of the Toltec dynasty and the last ruler, who saw the end of the Toltec glory and was forced into humiliation and exile. The first is described as a valiant triumphant warrior, but the last as a feeble and self-doubting old man. This caused Graulich and Gillespie to suggest that the general Aztec cyclical view of time, in which events repeated themselves at the end and beginning of cycles or eras was being inscribed into the historical record by the Aztecs, making it futile to attempt to distinguish between a historical Topiltzin Ce Acatl and a Quetzalcoatl deity. Graulich argued that the Toltec era is best considered the fourth of the five Aztec mythical "Suns" or ages, the one immediately preceding the fifth Sun of the Aztec people, presided over by Quetzalcoatl. This caused Graulich to consider that the only possibly historical data in the Aztec chronicles are the names of some rulers and possibly some of the conquests ascribed to them.

Furthermore, among the Nahuan peoples the word Tolteca was synonymous with artist, artisan or wise man, and Toltecayotl, literally 'Toltecness', meant art, culture, civilization, and urbanism and was seen as the opposite of Chichimecayotl ('Chichimecness'), which symbolized the savage, nomadic state of peoples who had not yet become urbanized. This interpretation argues that any large urban center in Mesoamerica could be referred to as Tollan and its inhabitants as Toltecs – and that it was a common practice among ruling lineages in Postclassic Mesoamerica to strengthen claims to power by asserting Toltec ancestry. Mesoamerican migration accounts often state that Tollan was ruled by Quetzalcoatl (or Kukulkan in Yucatec and Q'uq'umatz in Kʼicheʼ), a godlike mythical figure who was later sent into exile from Tollan and went on to found a new city elsewhere in Mesoamerica. According to Patricia Anawalt, a professor of anthropology at UCLA, assertions of Toltec ancestry and claims that their elite ruling dynasties were founded by Quetzalcoatl have been made by such diverse civilizations as the Aztec, the Kʼicheʼ and the Itza' Mayas.

While the skeptical school of thought does not deny that cultural traits of a seemingly central Mexican origin have diffused into a larger area of Mesoamerica, it tends to ascribe this to the dominance of Teotihuacán in the Classic period and the general diffusion of cultural traits within the region. Recent scholarship, then, does not see Tula, Hidalgo as the capital of the Toltecs of the Aztec accounts. Rather, it takes Toltec to mean simply an inhabitant of Tula during its apogee. Separating the term Toltec from those of the Aztec accounts, it attempts to find archaeological clues to the ethnicity, history and social organization of the inhabitants of Tula.

== See also ==
- Toltec Empire
- Indigenous peoples of Mexico
