= Toltec Empire =

Mesoamerican empire

Toltec Empire Altepetl Tollan
- 674 (disputed)–1122 (disputed)
- Emblem of the Toltec Empire

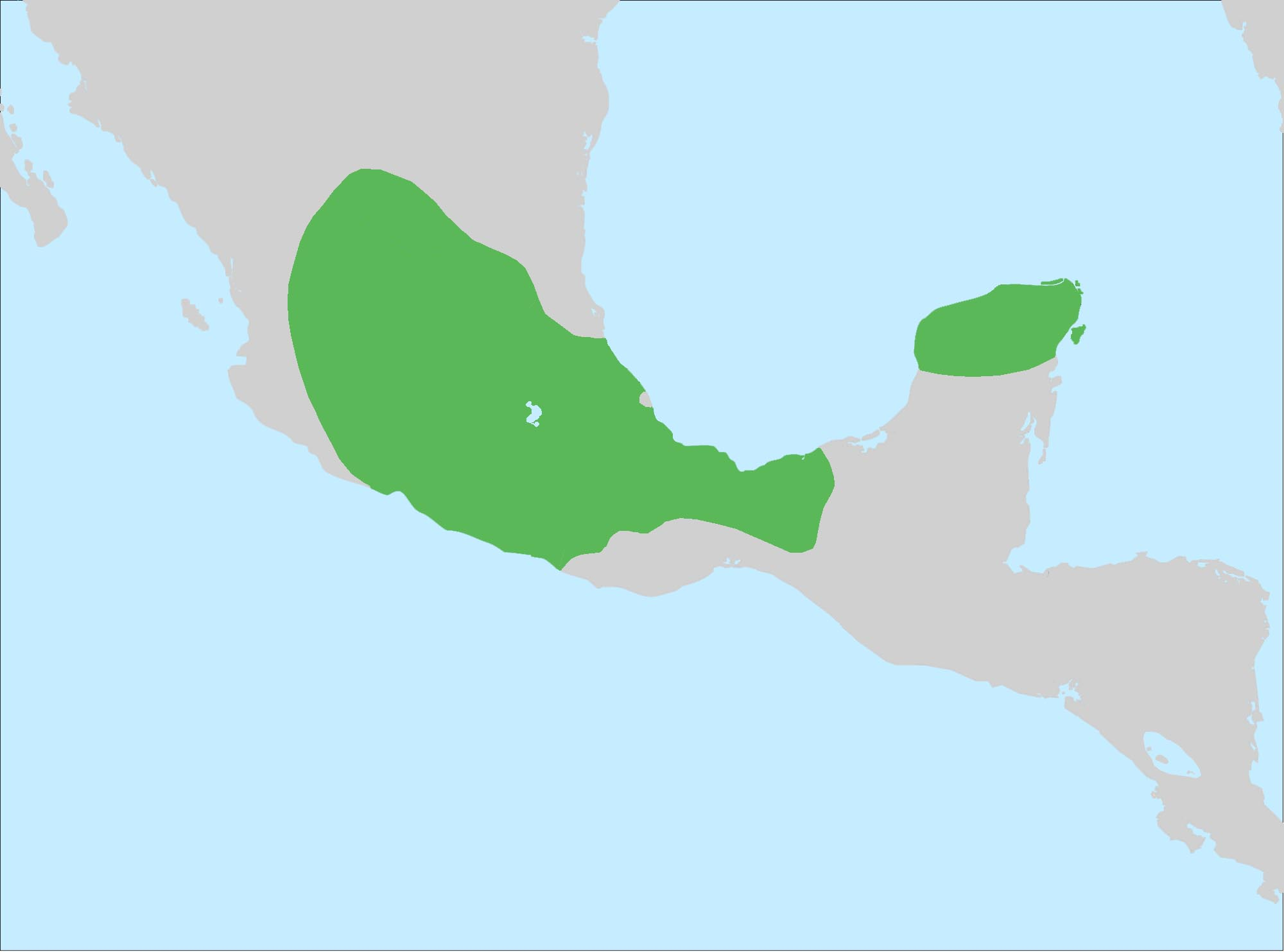
- Map of the empire's influence in Mexico in 950
- Status: Disputed
- Capital: Tollan-Xicocotitlan
- Common languages: Nahuatl, Mixtec, Totonac, Otomi, Pame, others
- Religion: Toltec religion
- Government: Monarchy
- Tlatoani (see List of rulers)
  - c. 6th-8th century: Chalchiuhtlanetzin or Mixcoamatzatzin (first)
  - c. 10th-11th century: Topiltzin, Tecpancaltzin or Huemac (last)
- Historical era: Classic/Post Classic
  - Toltecs arrive at Mam-he-mi, and rename it Tollan: 674 (disputed)
  - Topiltzin Ce Acatl Quetzalcoatl goes into exile and leaves for Tlapallan: 947 (disputed)
  - Abandonment of Tollan-Xicocotitlan: 1122 (disputed)

Population
  - 1000: 4.5 million
Preceded by
| Teotihuacan |
| Calakmul |
| Mezcala culture |
| Otomí people |
| Chupícuaro |
Succeeded by
| Tenochtitlan |
| Yopitzinco |
| Totonacapan |
| Azcapotzalco |
| Acolhua |
| Ecatepec |
| Chalco (altépetl) |
- 1. The status of the Toltecs as an empire has been disputed 2. Whether the Tollan dominated or even directly influenced the Yucatan area has also been disputed

The Toltec Empire, Toltec Kingdom or Altepetl Tollan was a political entity in pre-Hispanic Mexico that was associated with the Toltec culture. It existed through the Classic and Postclassic periods of Mesoamerican chronology, but gained most of its power in the Postclassic. During this time its sphere of influence reached as far away as the Yucatan Peninsula.

The capital city of this empire was Tollan-Xicocotitlan, while other important cities included Tulancingo and Huapalcalco.

== History ==
=== Classic ===
==== Before Tula ====
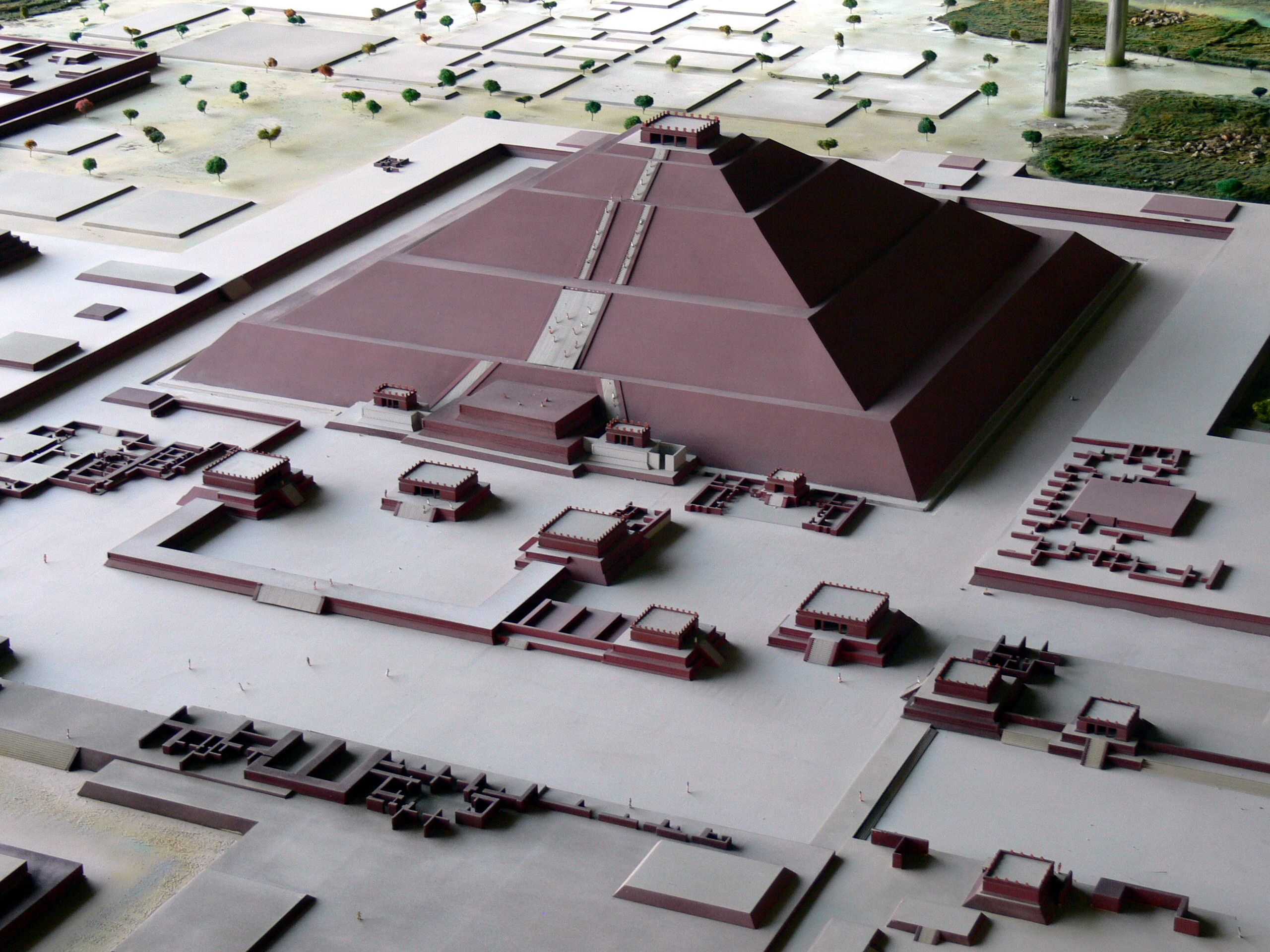
A reconstruction of Teotihuacán's Pyramid of the Sun

Oral traditions about the origin of Toltecs were collected by historians like Mariano de Veytia and Carlos María de Bustamante in the early 19th century. According to said accounts, there was a city named Tlachicatzin in a country ruled by the city of Huehuetlapallan, whose inhabitants called the people of Tlachicatzin "Toltecah", for their fame as dexterous artisans. In 583, led by two notables named Chalcaltzin and Tlacamihtzin, the Toltecah rebelled against their overlords in Huehuetlapallan and after thirteen years of resistance they ended up fleeing Tlachicatzin. Some of the Toltecah later founded a new settlement called Tlapallanconco in 604.

These narrations about the origin of the Toltecs have been disputed by archaeologists and historians like Manuel Gamio, Enrique Florescano and Laurette Séjourné; who had identified the Toltec city of Tollan with Teotihuacan, although this hypothesis has been criticized by many scholars, most notably historian Miguel León-Portilla.

==== Arrival at Tula and first rulers ====
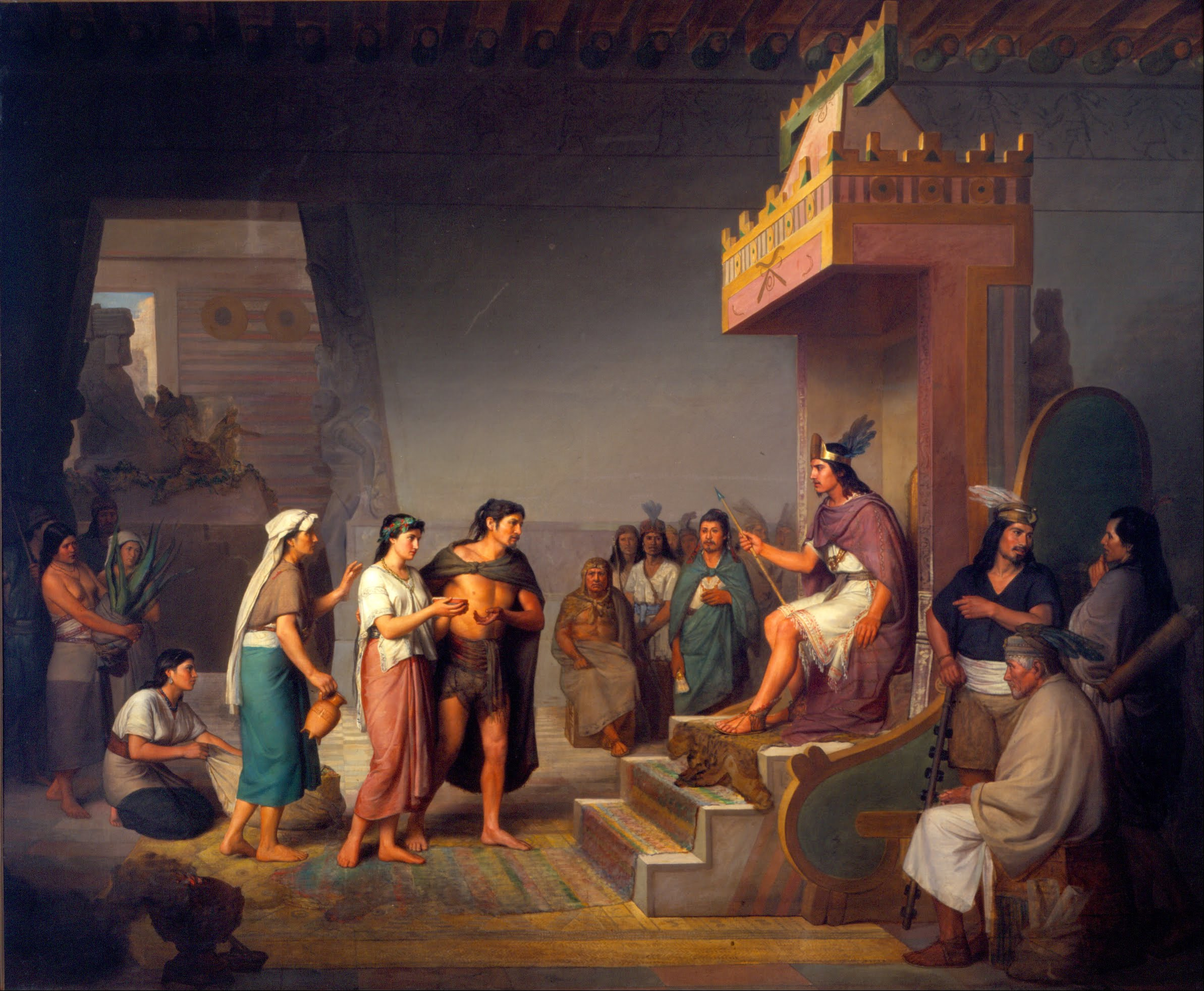
Iztaccaltzin on the throne being presented pulque, Papantzin in front of him, next to him is Xochitl. El descubrimiento del pulque (Obregón, 1869)

According to the Anales de Cuauhtitlan, the Toltec people came to be in the year 1-rabbit (674), the year they set up a theocracy to govern themselves, which was later reformed into a monarchy around the year 700 with the enthronement of Mimixcoamazatzin. (Some authors such as John Bierhorst have translated the Anales de Cuauhtitlan as stating that the Toltecs arrived in Tula in 726 and created their monarchy in 752).

The dynastic history of the Toltecs was recorded by several pre-Columbian and Colonial sources, although there are contradictions in most of them. Some sources say that a man named Huemac was the leader of the Toltecs when they arrived at Tula, while others begin the list of Toltec rulers, or tlatoani, with Chalchiutlanetzin, Mixcoamatzatzin, or even Cē Ācatl Topiltzin Quetzalcoatl.

Historians like Alfredo Chavero investigated the numerous proposed lists of Toltec rulers presented in the works of authors like Fernando de Alva Ixtlilxóchitl and Juan de Torquemada, and in anonymous sources like the Codex Chimalpopoca. According to Chavero, his research led him to conclude that most of the traditional recounts of the Toltec royalty are not reliable because they were recorded in a style similar to the medieval Chansons de geste, something that became evident once he realised that most of the reigns of the Toltec monarchs lasted 52 years, which is exactly the duration of the 52 year-long cycle of the Mesoamerican calendars, known in nahuatl as Xiuhmolpilli. Therefore, Chavero concluded, that most of the traditional Toltec royal accounts and exploits must be legendary in nature.

According to one of those legends, during the reign of Tecpancaltzin Iztaccaltzin, a Toltec man named Papantzin invented a type of fermented syrup made from the maguey plant. He sent his daughter Xochitl with a bowl of the fermented syrup, today known as pulque, as a gift for the Tlatoani of the Toltecs (in some versions Papantzin would go along with Xochitl). Tecpancaltzin fell in love with the messenger, who kept coming with more bowls of pulque from time to time. After some more visits, the tlatoani granted lands and nobility status to Papantzin, and eventually married Xochitl, who would give birth to a boy named Meconetzin (Child of the Maguey in Nahuatl), who became prince of Tollan.

Between 900 and 950, Tollan underwent a major urban redevelopment as the original urban center, today known as Tula Chico (Little Tula), was largely abandoned in favor of a new district, where most of the main religious and political buildings, like the Palacio Quemado (Burnt Palace), were eventually located. This new district is today known as Tula Grande (Great Tula). Also by this time, Tollan had become a magnet for migrants from the surrounding areas, giving the city a large and ethnically diverse population, with the Nonoalca and Chichimeca being the most important groups in the city.

==== Reign of Quetzalcoatl ====
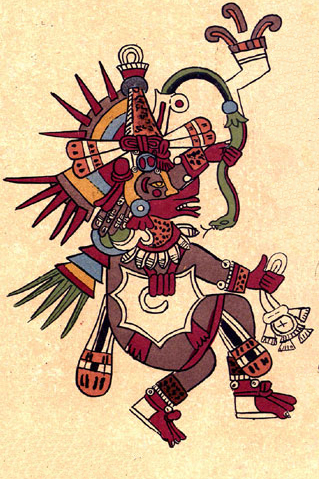
Quetzalcoatl

According to the Anales de Cuauhtitlan, the city of Tollan-Xicocotitlan was ruled by the priest-king Cē Ācatl Topiltzin Quetzalcoatl from 923 to 947. This ruler was born in the year 895 at Michatlauhco, a place which according to Mexican archaeologist Wigberto Jiménez Moreno could be located near the present-day town of Tepoztlán, in the Mexican state of Morelos.

Quetzalcoatl was regarded as a wise and benevolent ruler, who made Tollan a "prosperous city in which their inhabitants -the Toltecs- were endowed with great qualities". At the same time he was regarded as a holy and pious man, who engaged regularly in acts of penance. Cē Ācatl Topiltzin preached against the practice of human sacrifices, arguing that the supreme deity whose name he took for himself wasn't pleased with the practice of ritual killings.

According to Bernardino de Sahagún, one day, Topiltzin Quetzalcoatl was visited by an elderly man (said to be Tezcatlipoca in disguise) who offered him a "medicine" that would make him younger. This medicine was just a bowl of pulque, and after tasting it, the king invited his sister, the priestess Quetzalpetlatl, to drink with him, with both getting drunk soon after. Because of their drunkenness, both siblings forgot their sacred duties and acted disgracefully, damaging their reputations. After this humiliation, Quetzalcoatl left Tollan in 947, and traveled to the east, to the mythical land of Tlapallan, which according to tradition was located on the coast of the Gulf of Mexico. There, Quetzalcoatl took a canoe and immolated himself.

==== Internal conflicts and settlement in Yucatan ====
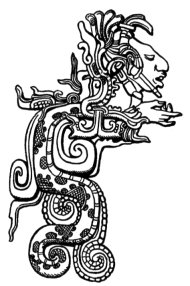
Kukulkan

Some authors, like Mexican historian Vicente Riva Palacio, argue that Quetzalcoatl died earlier, in 931; and that said event would trigger political instability in Tollan, eventually leading to an important migration of Toltecs to other parts of Mesoamerica around 981, especially to the Yucatan Peninsula, where they would mainly settle at the city of Uxmal. Regardless of the exact date of Quetzalcoatl's death, traditional accounts indicate that at the end of the tenth century, a religious war broke between members of the cult of Tezcatlipoca and supporters of Quetzalcoatl. The adherents of Quetzalcoatl didn't favour large-scale human sacrifices, which were largely suppressed by Ce Acatl Topiltzin during his reign, while the adherents of Tezcatlipoca regarded them as an essential part of their religion. Also, the supporters of Quetzalcoatl and his reforms were mostly of Nonoalca background while the supporters of the cult of Tezcatlipoca were mostly of Chichimeca background.

According to Diego Durán, the conflict was brief, but eventually a second war between the two groups broke out. This war lasted from 1046 to 1110, and ended with the defeat of the followers of Quetzalcoatl. Because of the violence, many of those who supported Ce Acatl Topiltzin fled Tollan, with a sizeable portion of these exiles heading towards the Maya cultural area. According to Mexican archaeologist Román Piña Chan, the cult of Quetzalcoatl (known as Kukulkan in Yucatan) was introduced in the region by the Itza around 987 AD. The Itza were a group of mixed Putún Maya and Toltec descent, which had welcomed immigrants from Tollan time moving into the Yucatán Peninsula, and had adopted the religious teachings of the Toltecs.

As they traveled southwards, some followers of Ce Acatl Topiltzin seem to have followed his example and adopted the name "Quetzalcoatl" and its Maya equivalents, "Kukulkan" and "Q'uq'umatz", for themselves. According to Mexican historian Miguel León-Portilla, these new "Quetzalcoatl" leaders often led their own followers into military actions against the Mayan peoples. The exploits of these personages had become source of misunderstandings and confusion for researchers over centuries, as they are often confused with Ce Acatl Topiltzin himself.

=== Post-Classic ===
==== Collapse of Tula and Toltec diaspora ====
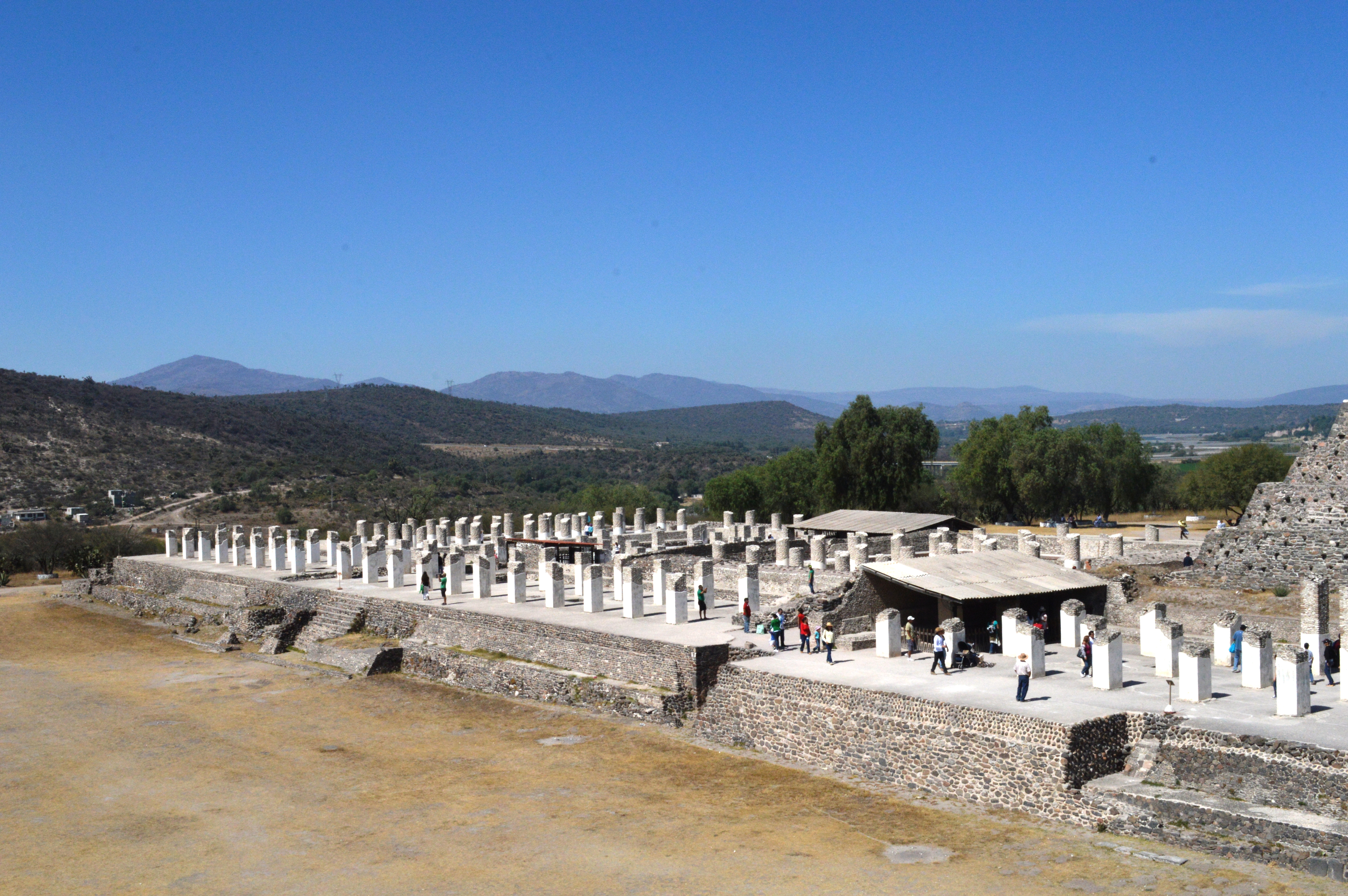
The Burnt Palace (Palacio Quemado- Building C) at Tula

The ethno-religious conflicts between the Nonoalca and the Chichimeca, along with the great famine that affected Tollan between 1070 and 1077, led to a series of important migrations from Tollan to other parts of Mesoamerica in the late 11th century and early 12th century. One of these groups of Toltec exiles eventually took over the city of Cholula, in the present-day Mexican state of Puebla, around 1200.

According to Durán, in 1115, tribes from the north (probably Chichimecas, Otomi or Huastecs) attacked the domains of Tollan. After a series of brutal battles at the villages of Nextalpan and Texcalapan, in which both sides took and sacrificed numerous prisoners, the Toltecs were defeated in 1116. After this defeat, Huemac, the priest-king of Tollan, abandoned the city along with other Toltecs and headed south, to the city of Xaltocan, in the Valley of Mexico. Soon, the king would be abandoned by his closest followers, who chose a man called Nauhyotl as their leader; while the majority of the Toltecs would split in smaller groups and begin their diaspora across Mesoamerica.

In 1122, shortly after being betrayed by his followers, Huemac hanged himself in Chapultepec, and by 1150, Tula was virtually abandoned. Some Toltecs would remain around the ruins of their former capital, where they would be under the rule of Culhuacán, a nearby city-state. After the fall and abandonment of Tollan in the 12th century, the former Toltec dominions would be ruled by numerous smaller city-states, which are known as altepetl in Nahuatl, most of which would be ruled by descendants (both real and self-proclaimed) of the Toltec nobility. Toltec heritage became the standard of the nobility in most of Mesoamerica. Because of this, many rulers of later kingdoms and empires would claim Toltec lineage as a way to legitimize their power, including the Aztec emperors, the Mixtec kings in Oaxaca, and the K'iche' and Kakchiquel rulers in Guatemala.

== Rulers ==
=== List of rulers ===
Pre-Columbian and Colonial documents describe the Toltec rulers, but most of those accounts are legendary in nature, and therefore not historically reliable. Some lists include figures such as Ce Acatl Topiltzin Quetzalcoatl and queen Xochitl as rulers, but most of them omit them.

According to Fernando de Alva Ixtlilxóchitl, these would be the Toltec rulers:

| Name | Reign | Lifespan | Family |
|---|---|---|---|
| Chalchiuhtlanetzin | 510-562 | | |
| Ixtlilcuechahauac | 562-614 | | |
| Huetzin | 614-666 | | |
| Totepeuh | 666-718 | | |
| Nacaxoc | 718-770 | | |
| Tlacomihua | 770-826 | | |
| Xihuiquenitzin | 826-830 | | |
| Tecpancaltzin Iztaccaltzin | 830-875 | ?-911 | Mother: Xihuiquenitzin; Wife: Xochitl; Son: Meconetzin |
| Meconetzin | 875-927 | | |
| Mitl | 927-979 | | |
| Xiuhtlaltzin | 979-983 | | |
| Tecpancaltzin | 983–1031 | | |
| Topiltzin | 1031–1063 | | |

According to the author of the Anónimo Mexicano, all but one of the rulers of Tollan ruled for 52 years, and the only exception had instead produced a council interregnum after her short rule. Thus, the author names the following Toltec rulers:

| Name | Reign |
|---|---|
| Chalchiuhtlanetzin | 511 (Note: The year is stated to be 7 acatl; a number of starting points is virtually infinite, owing to the cyclical nature of year-naming in the Xiuhpohualli. However, one of such possibilities is quite close to the starting year given by Ixtlilxochitl (510) for this particular reign, falling on the year immediately following.)-563 |
| Ixtlilcuechahauac | 563-615 |
| Huetzin | 615-667 |
| Totepeuh | 667-719 |
| Nacazcayotl | 719-771 |
| Mitl | 771-823 |
| Xiuhtzaltzin | 823-827 |
| Interregnum (Note: Quote: ynic chicome ôtla tocatic ce cihuatl ytoca Xiuhtzaltzin, otlanahuyxiuh =quixti, ynic zatepan cemochintin ýteteuctin quihui=cataque (The seventh who ruled was a woman named Xiuhtzaltzin. She lasted four years in the government, and afterwards all the lords ruled together.)) | No duration given. |
| Tecpancaltzin (Note: According to a comment by Torquemada (Monarquía Indiana, 1.14-37), Tecpanecaltzin was also called Topiltzin, which instead of a name may be more of a title, as its literal translation is "our honourable prince".) | "52 years" (Note: Ixtlilxochitl provides 1031 as the end of this ruler's reign. Curiously, this date is 10 cycles of 52 years distant from the starting year of 511, allowing for one or two more rulers to exist in-between Xiuhtzaltzin and her son's reigns.) |

Francisco Javier Clavijero provides a very similar list, modifying only the starting and ending years and using Ixtlilxochitl's version of the Anónimo's names, while using an alternative name for the final ruler:

| Name | Reign |
|---|---|
| Chalchiuhtlanetzin | 667-719 |
| Ixtlilcuechahauac | 719-771 |
| Huetzin | 771-823 |
| Totepeuh | 823-875 |
| Nacaxoc | 875-927 |
| Mitl | 927-979 |
| Xiuhtlaltzin | 979-983 |
| Interregnum | 983-1031 |
| Topiltzin | 1031–1063 |

According to the Anales de Cuauhtitlan, these would be the Toltec rulers, though alternative periods may be attained by adding a calendar cycle of 52 years to each date:

| Name | Reign |
|---|---|
| Mixcoamatzatzin | 701-767 |
| Huetzin | 767-782 |
| Ilhuitimal | 783–821 |
| Ce Acatl Topiltzin Quetzalcoatl | 822–844 |
| Matlacxochitl | 844–880 |
| Nauhyotzin | 880–895 |
| Matlaccoatzin | 896-924 |
| Tlilcoatzin | 925-947 |
| Huemac (Atecpanécatl) | 948–1023 |

The Memorial Breve mentions only two Toltec rulers, and makes little note of the first one:

| Name | Born | Reign | Notes |
|---|---|---|---|
| Huemac | 963 | 993-1029 | Son of Totepeuh, king of Colhuacan |
| Acxitl Topiltzin | 1002 | 1029-1051 | Tollan is said to fallen into unrest in 1036, while its subjects had mostly abandoned it and dispersed by 1040. Said to have gone "through the place where the sun rises; [...] to have gone to the place of smoke, to the place of colors" |

- All dates are AD

== Society ==
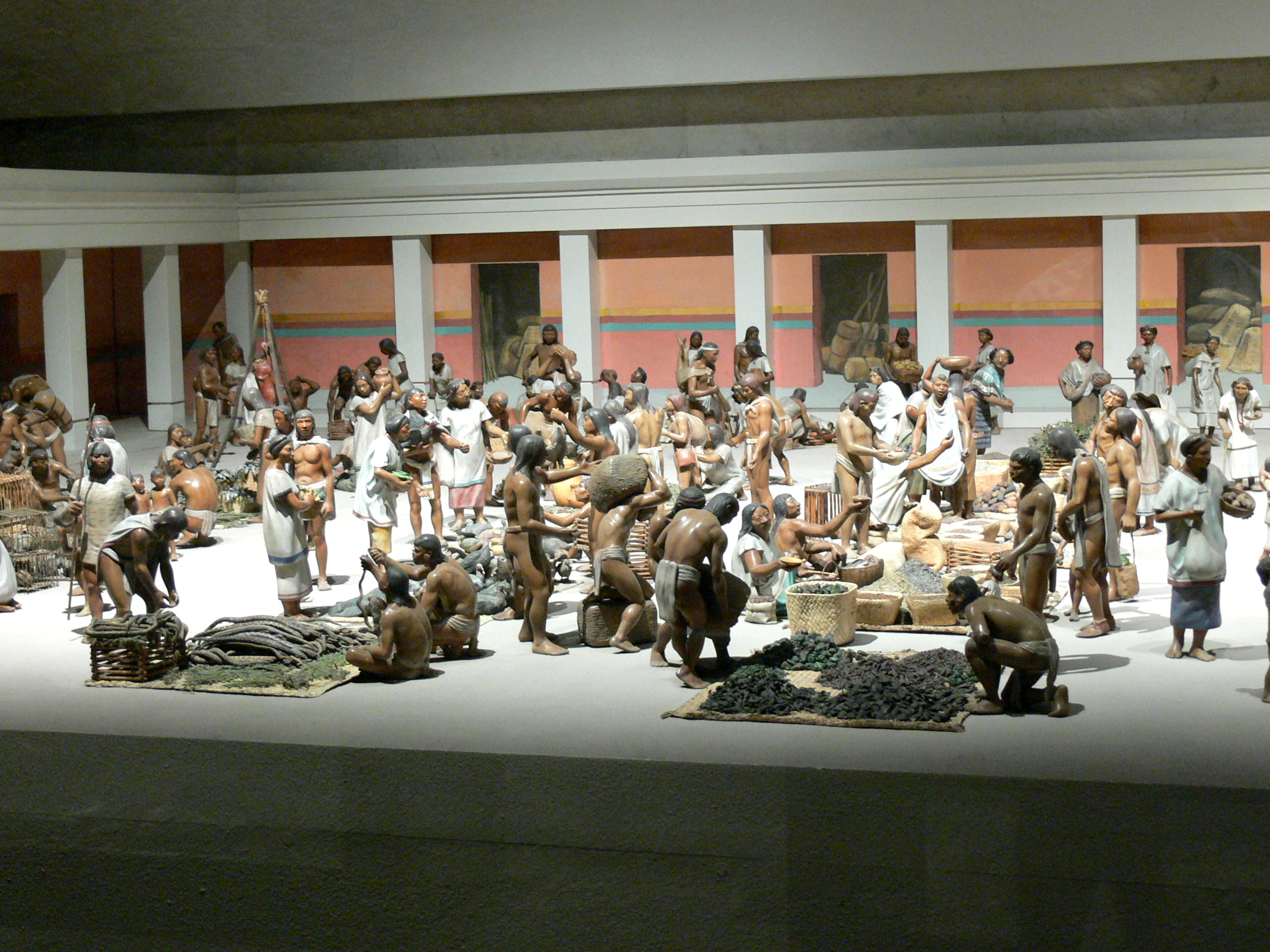
A Mesoamerican tianguis market place

=== Slavery ===
The status of slaves in the Toltec world is not well-documented. It is known, however, that the Huastec and others were carried weeping into Tula, possibly as victims for sacrificial ceremonies or as doomed chattel. However, this story has also been interpreted as referring to the introduction of the cult of Tlazolteotl.

== Art ==
=== Architecture ===
Most of Tula was set up in a grid plan. The buildings were made of stone with an adobe finish. The Atlantes of Tula are representations of the god Tlahuizcalpantecuhtli in warrior attire which were used as columns to hold up the roof of the great room in the god's temple.

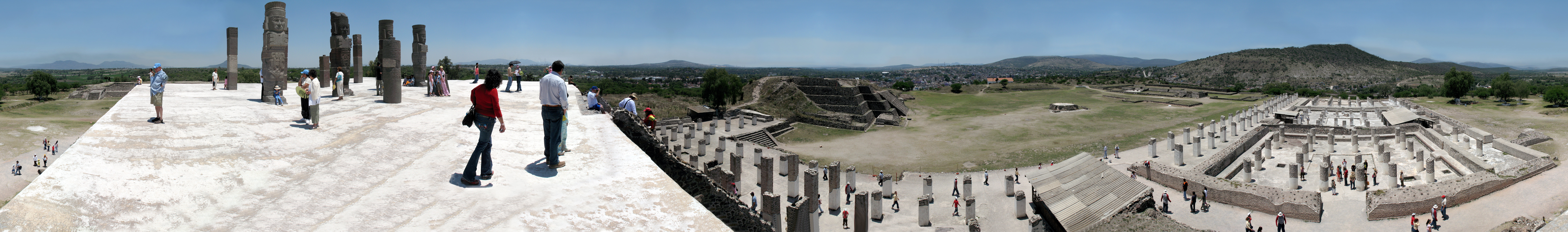
Tula from pyramid B
Toltec architecture
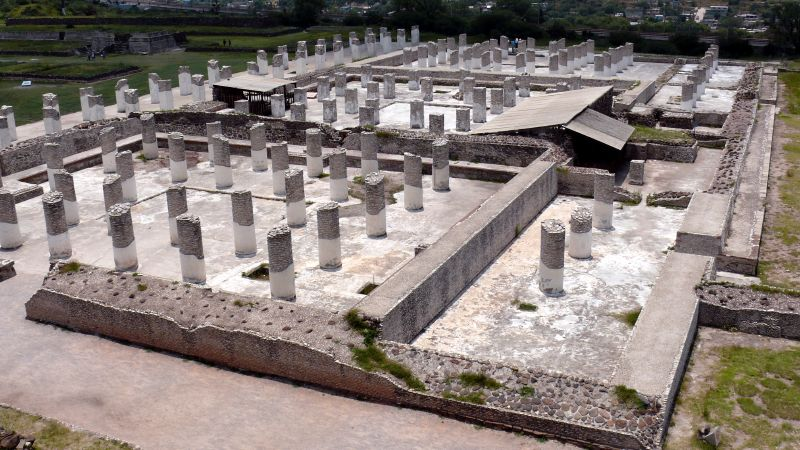

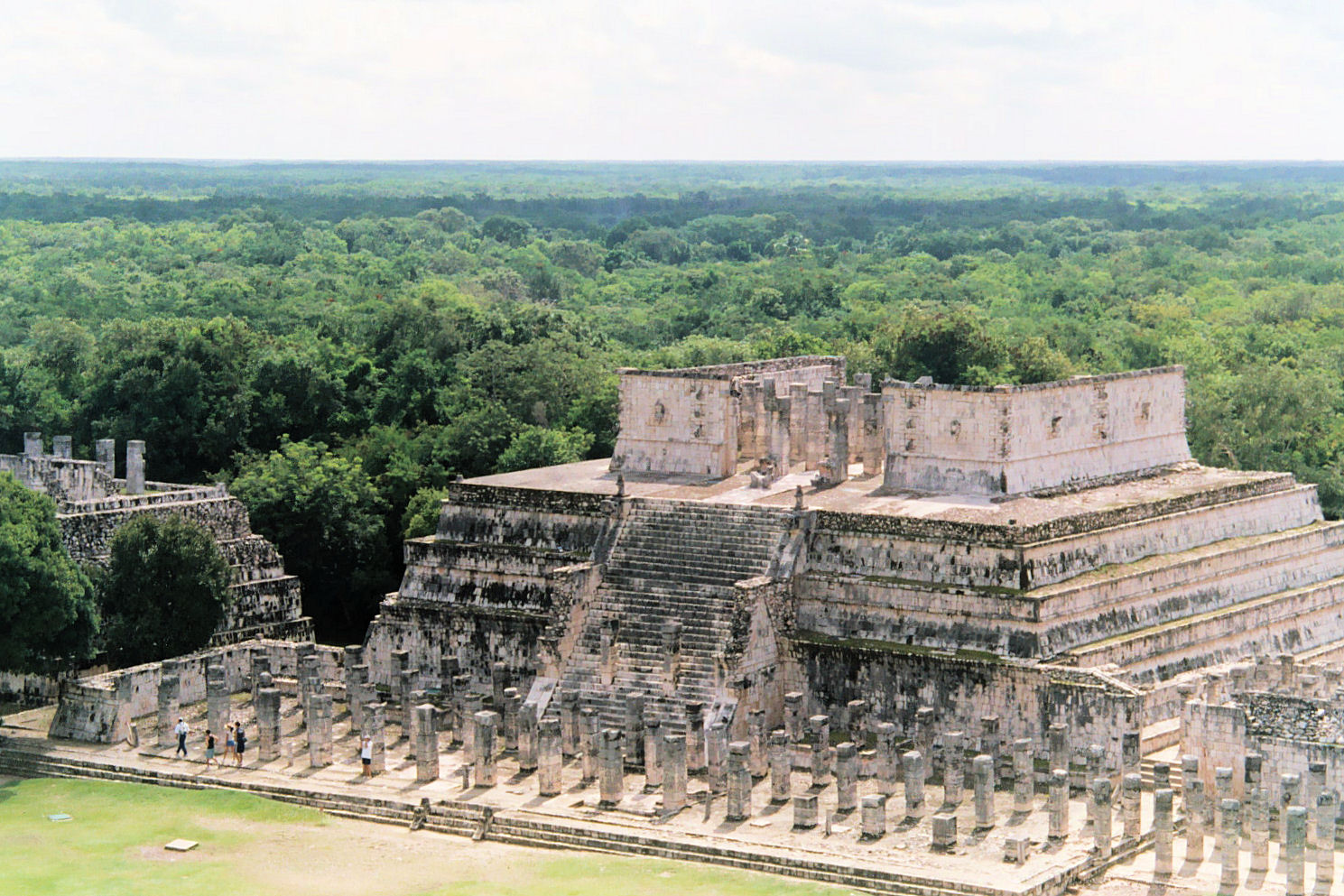

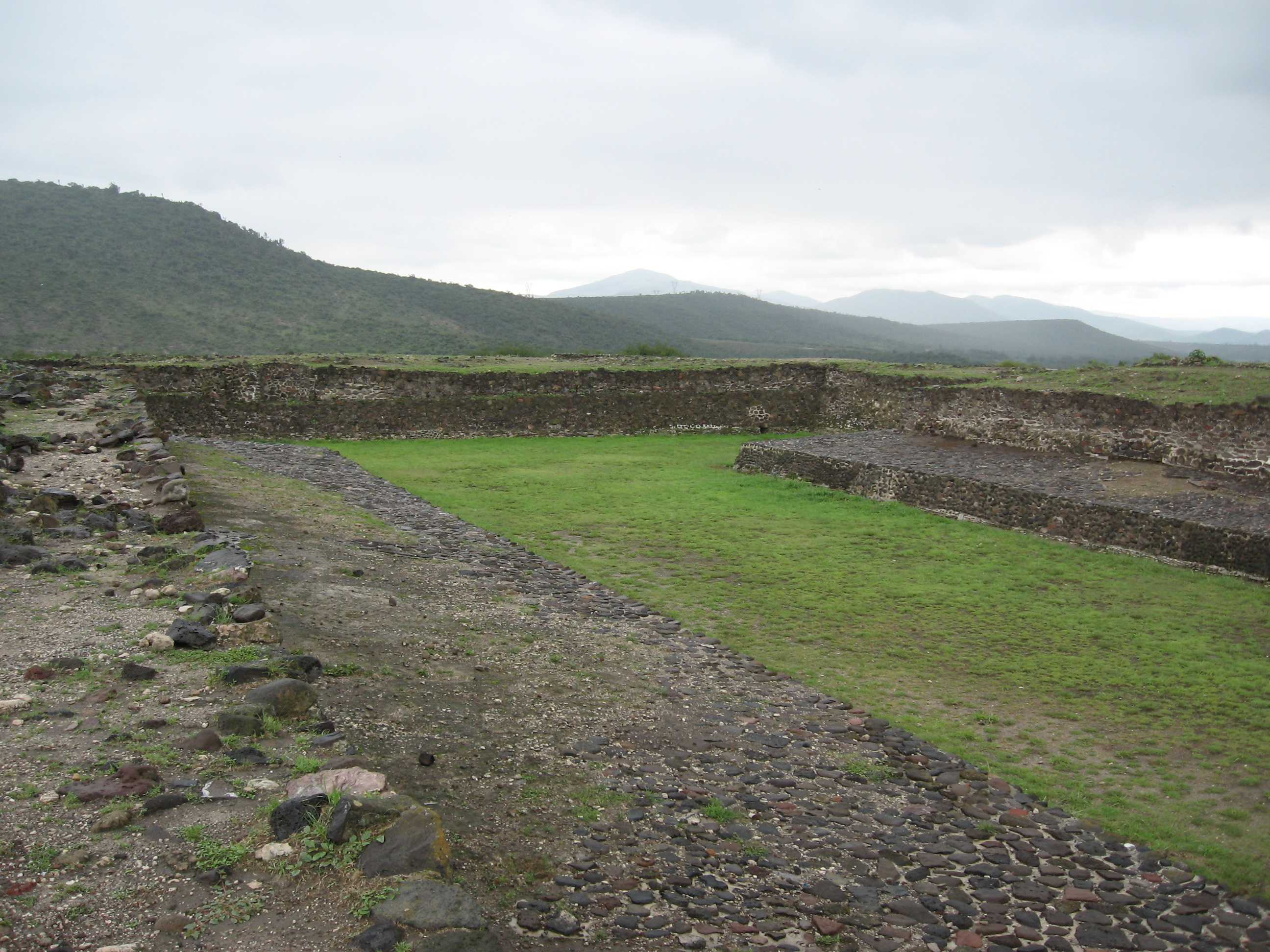

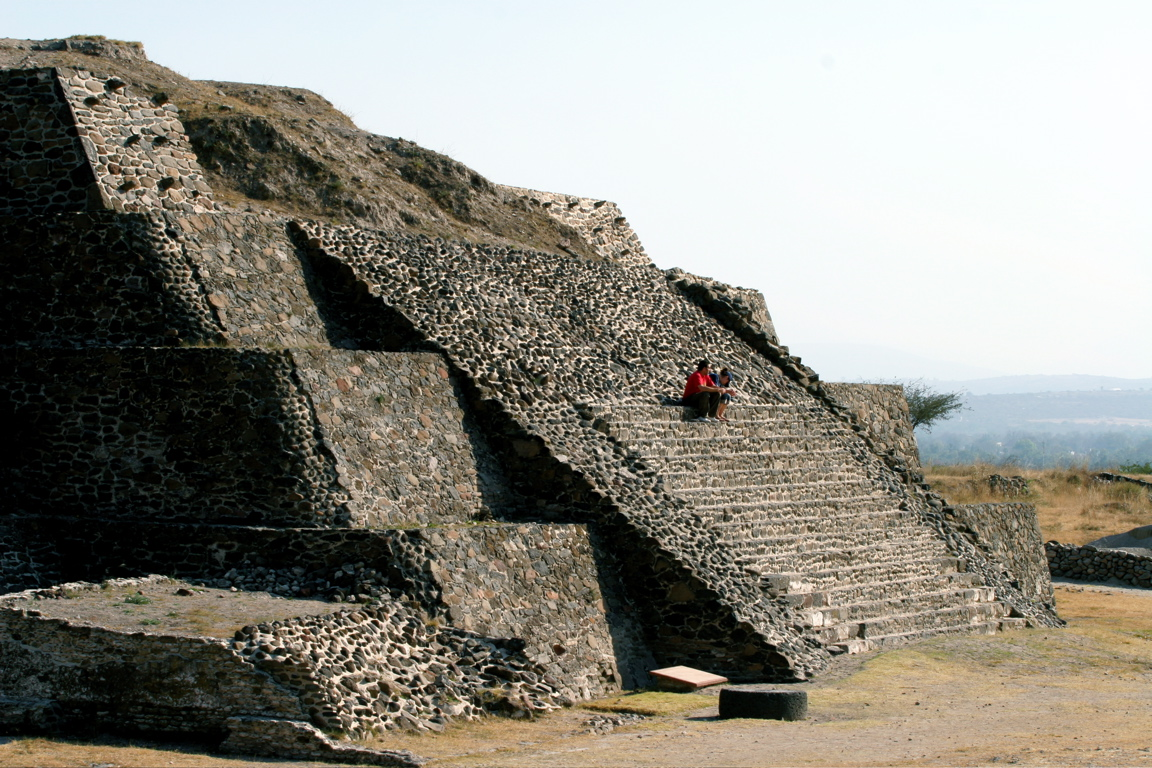

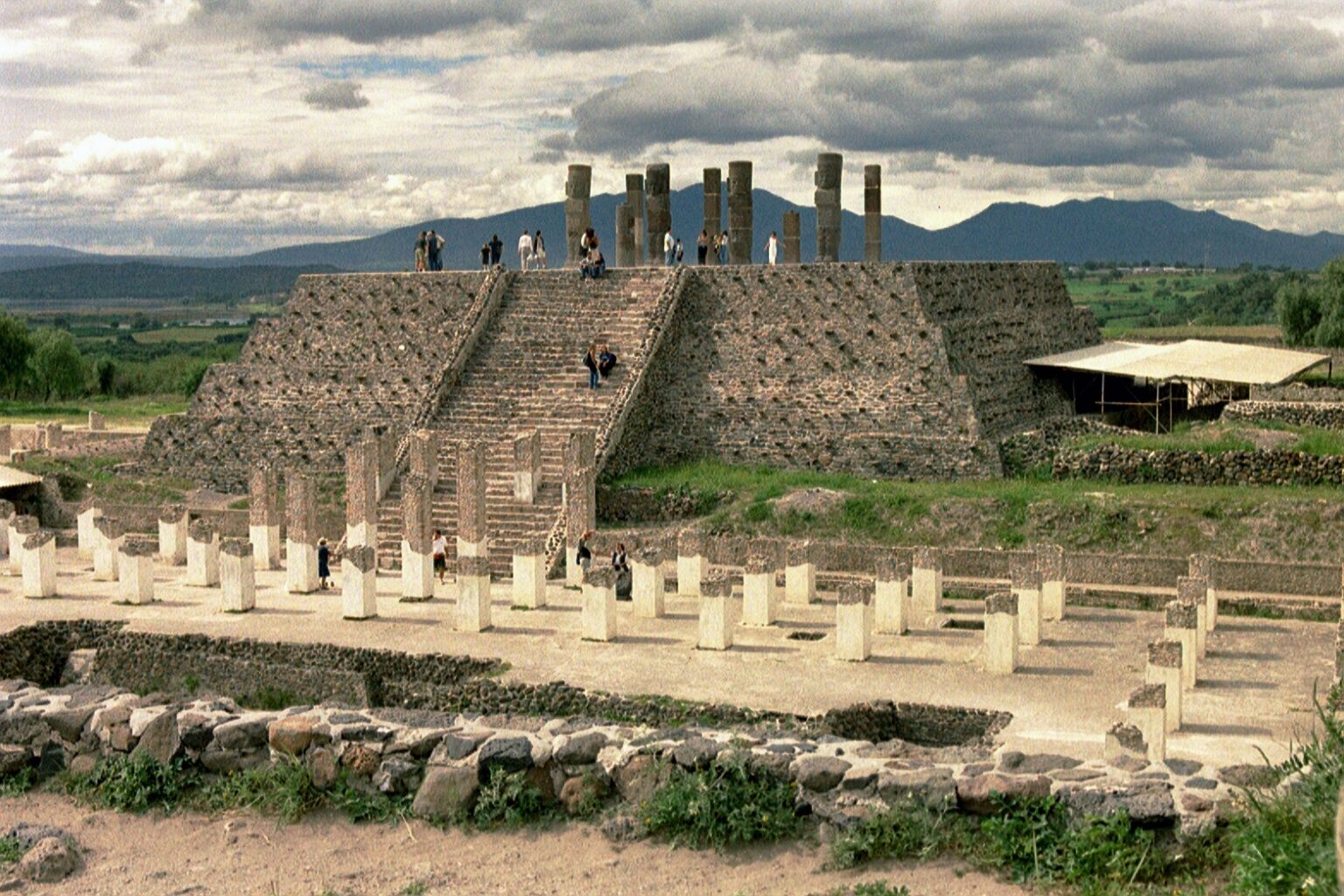

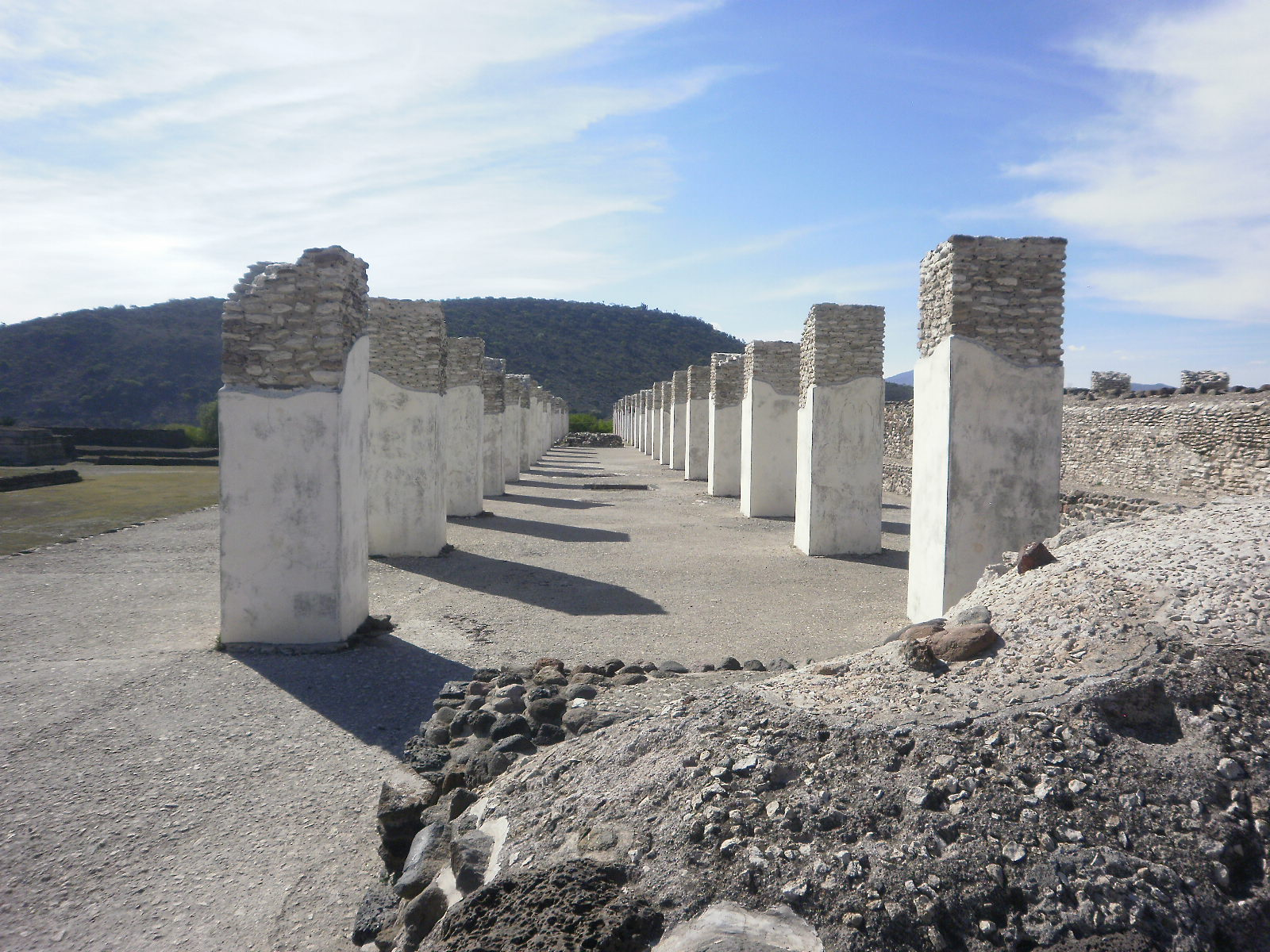

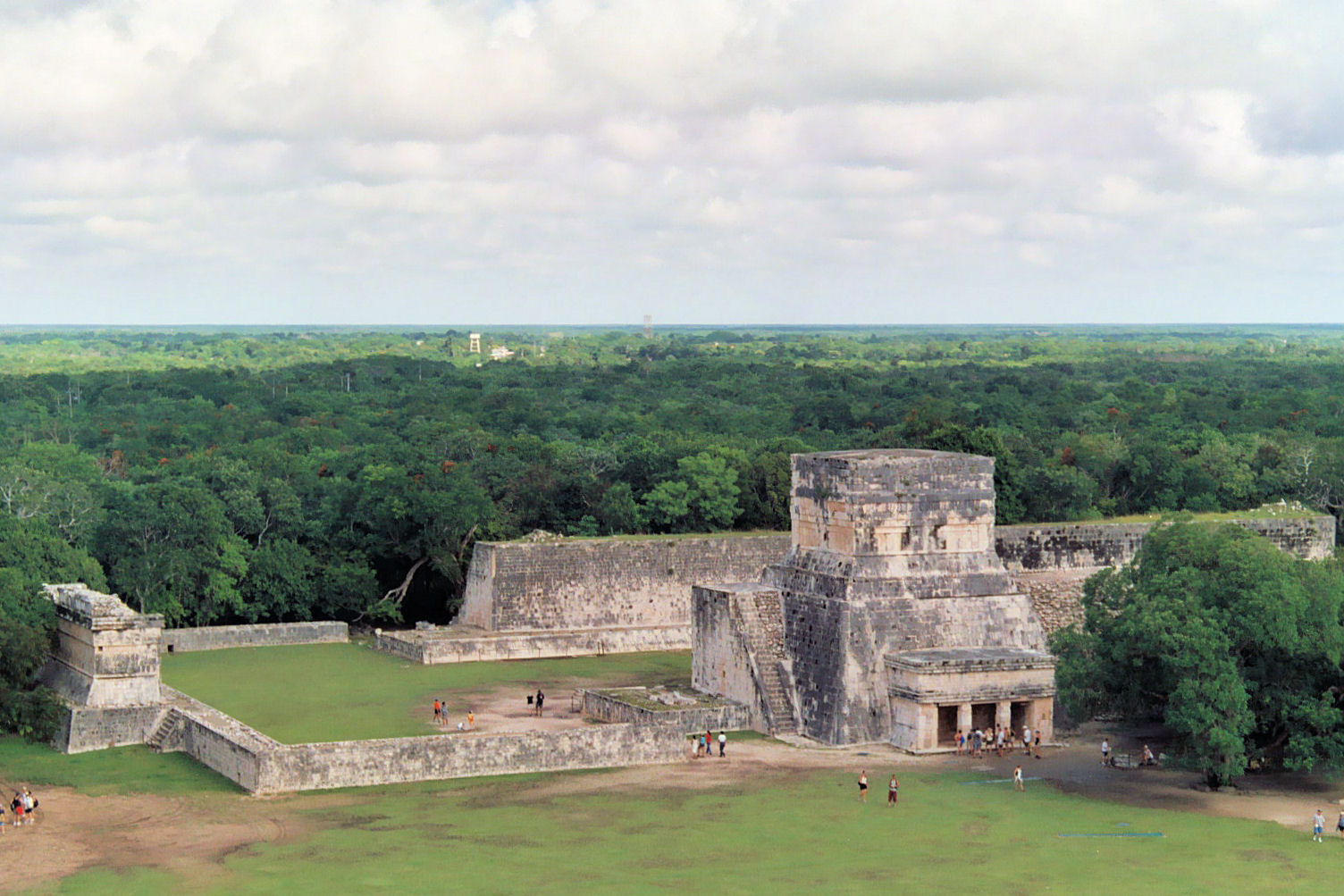

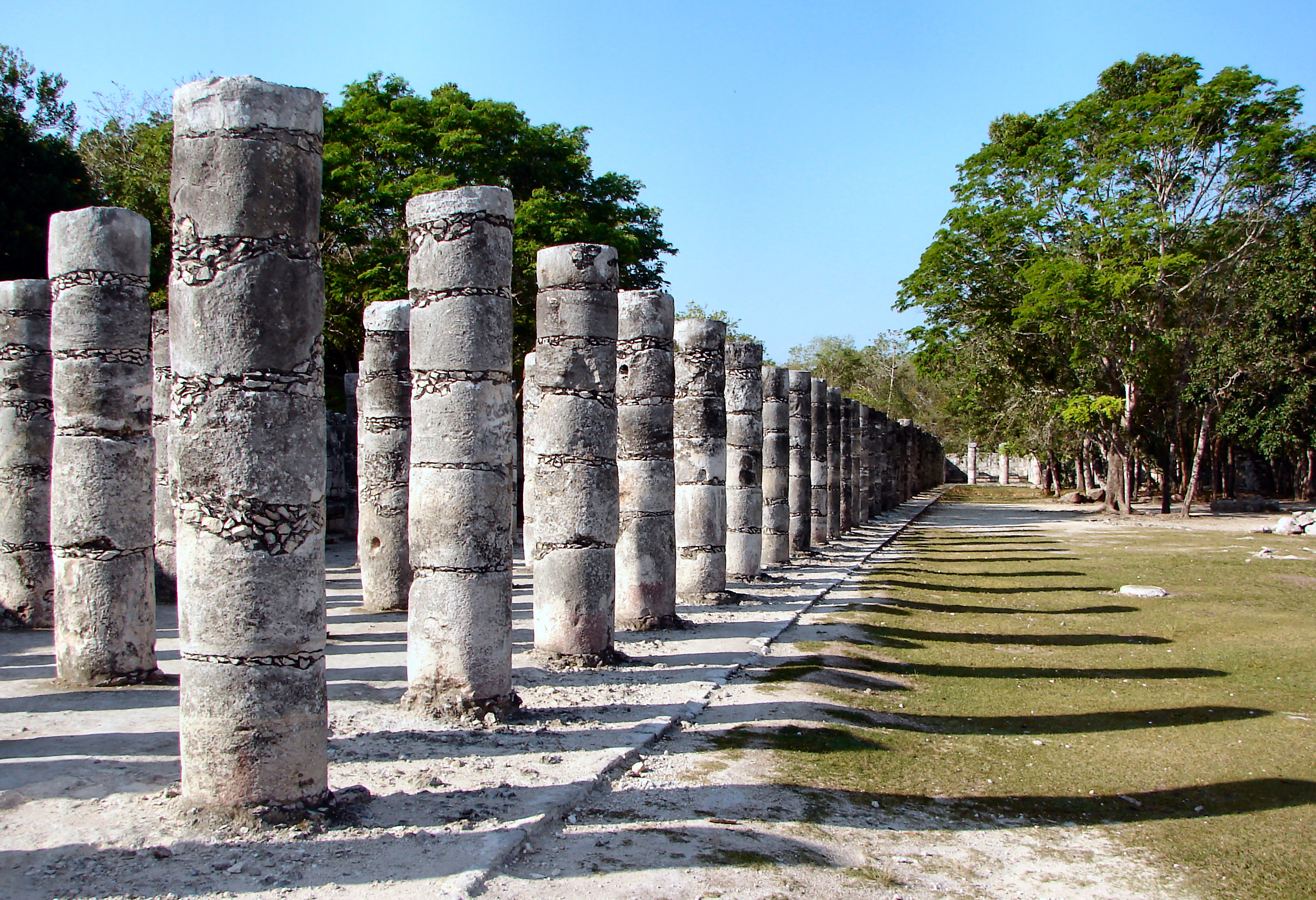

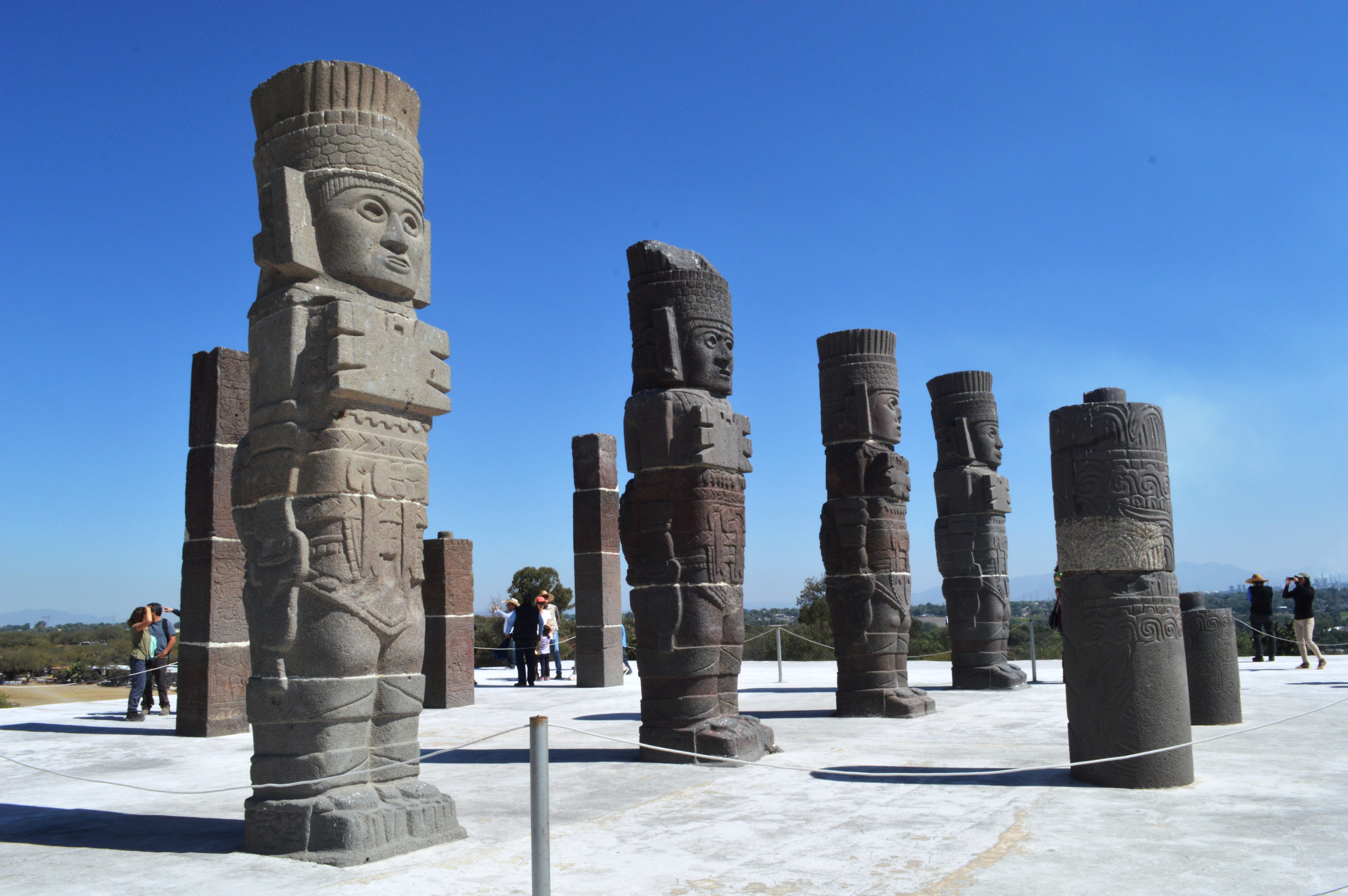

=== Sculpture ===
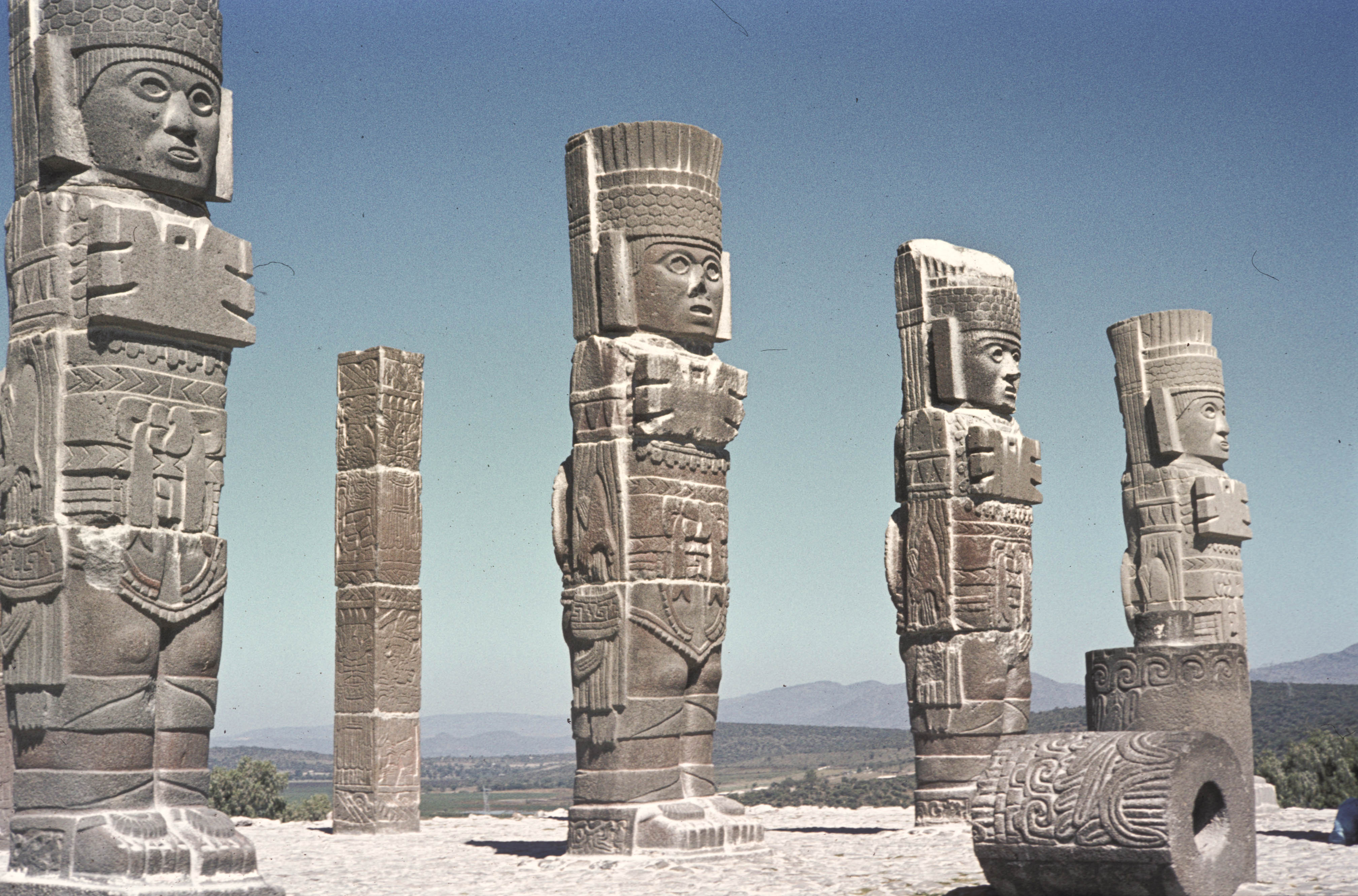
Atlantes of Tula, 1980

Some of the most famous Toltec sculptures are the Atlanteans of Tula. These monoliths measure just over 4.5 meters high. They are carved in stone basalt, and are representations of the Toltec god Tlahuizcalpantecuhtli in warrior attire. They are clothed in butterfly breastplates. Their weapons are atlatls, darts, knives of flint, and curved weapon that are characteristic of the warrior representations in the Toltec culture.

The monumental Atlanteans are at the top of the Temple of Tlahuizcalpantecutli (also called "Morning Star"), wherefrom which all the main plaza can be seen; these sculptures are characterized by their large size and detail.

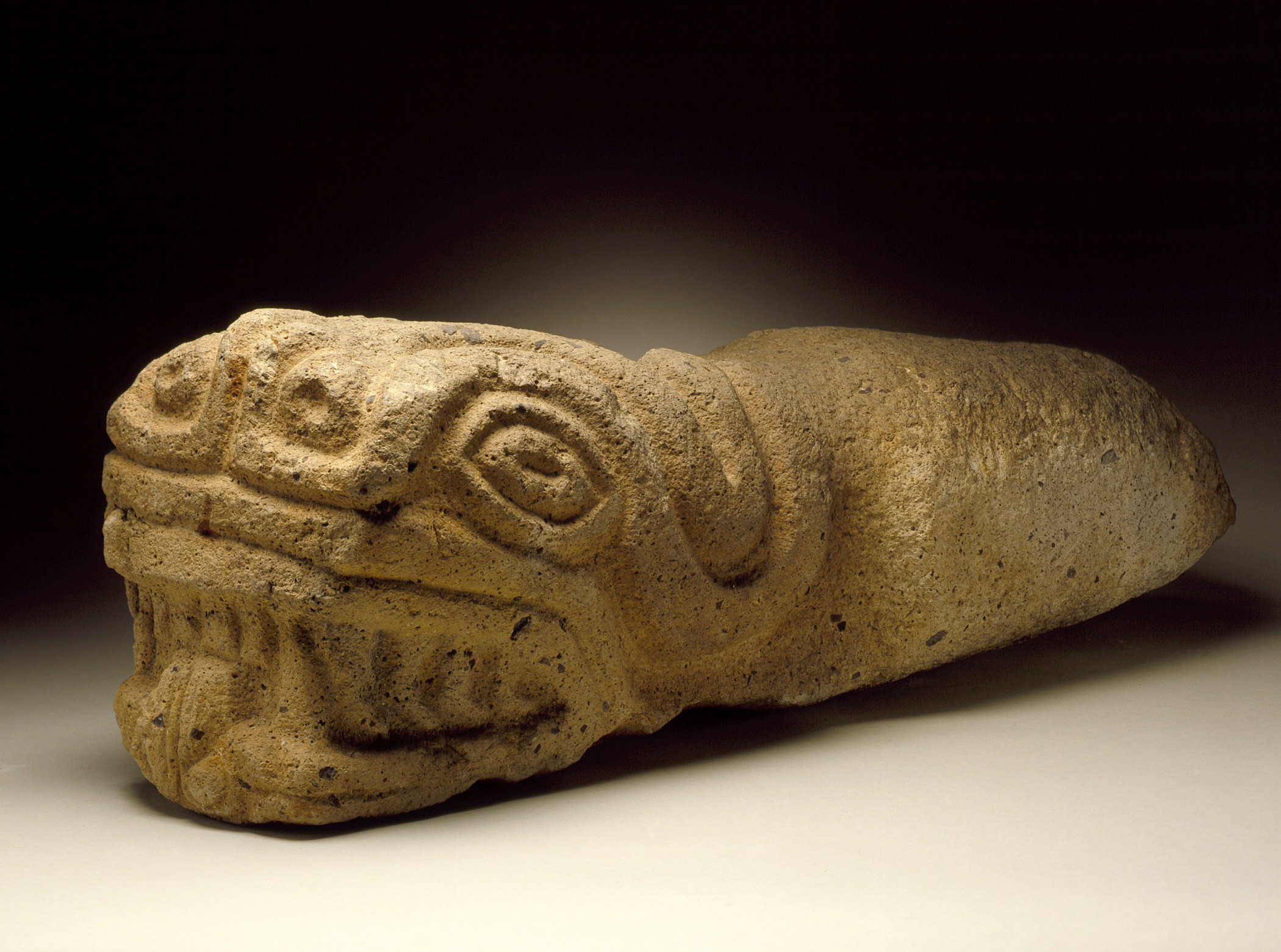
A stone jaguar from c. 800 AD

== International relations ==
=== Gulf coast ===
The Toltecs founded colonies in Veracruz. Toltec influences have been noted in the bas-relief slabs on the side of the ballcourt in El Tajín and in statues from Castillo de Teayo.

=== Maya region ===
==== Chichen Itza ====
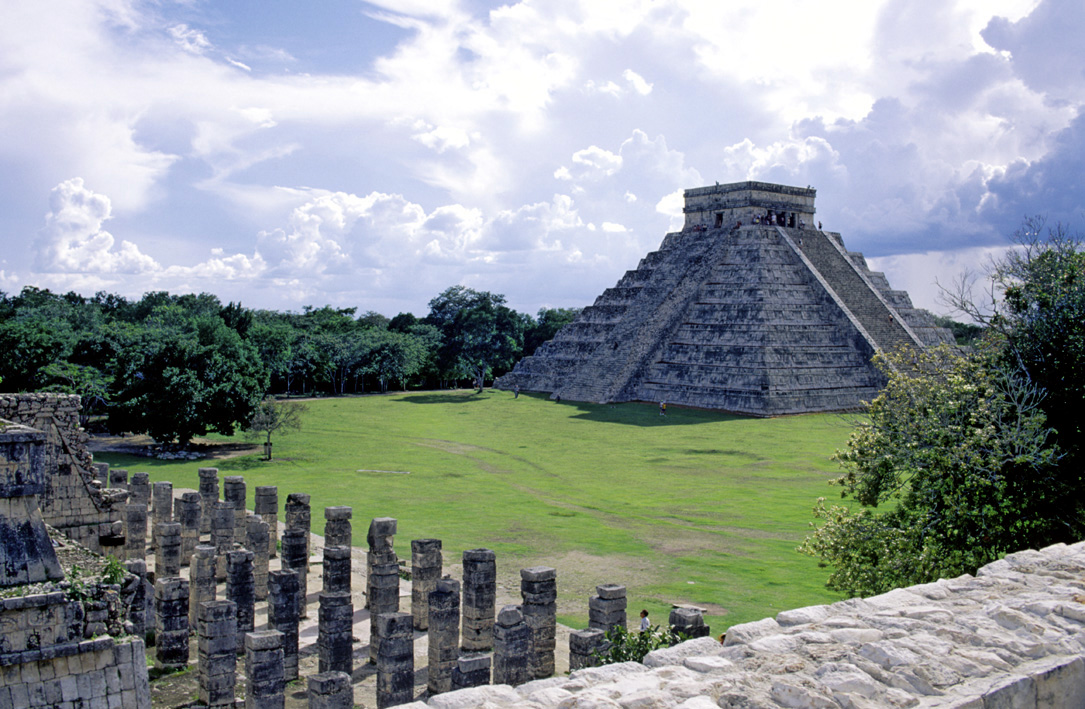
Chichen Itza

One of the most controversial topics involving the Toltecs is the nature of their relationship with Chichen Itza. The similarities between the two cities has raised several hypotheses about the nature of the links between the two, although none of them have the full support of the specialists in the field. In the 19th century, French archaeologist Désiré Charnay was the first person who pointed out that the main plazas of Tula and Chichen Itza were similar, a fact that led him to postulate that the city could have been conquered by Toltecs led by Topiltzin Quetzalcoatl, who Charnay referred as Kukulkan. This hypothesis was defended in the 20th century by Herbert Joseph Spinden, an art historian who became obsessed with the idea and often used pseudo-historical sources to back his claim about a conquest of the Itza Maya by Quetzalcoatl.

The conquest hypothesis of Charnay and Spinden has been largely abandoned in modern archaeology as more evidence suggests that instead of a conquest of Chichen Itza by the Toltecs, the Itza people had already embraced Toltec teachings before moving to Yucatan; also, according to Mexican historian Miguel León-Portilla, many of the references to leaders with the name "Quetzalcoatl", "Kukulkan" or "Q'uq'umatz" in the Maya sources may not even refer to Cē Ācatl Topiltzin Quetzalcoatl himself, but to some of his followers and their disciples who also took the name of the Feathered Serpent deity for themselves.

==== Rest of Yucatan ====
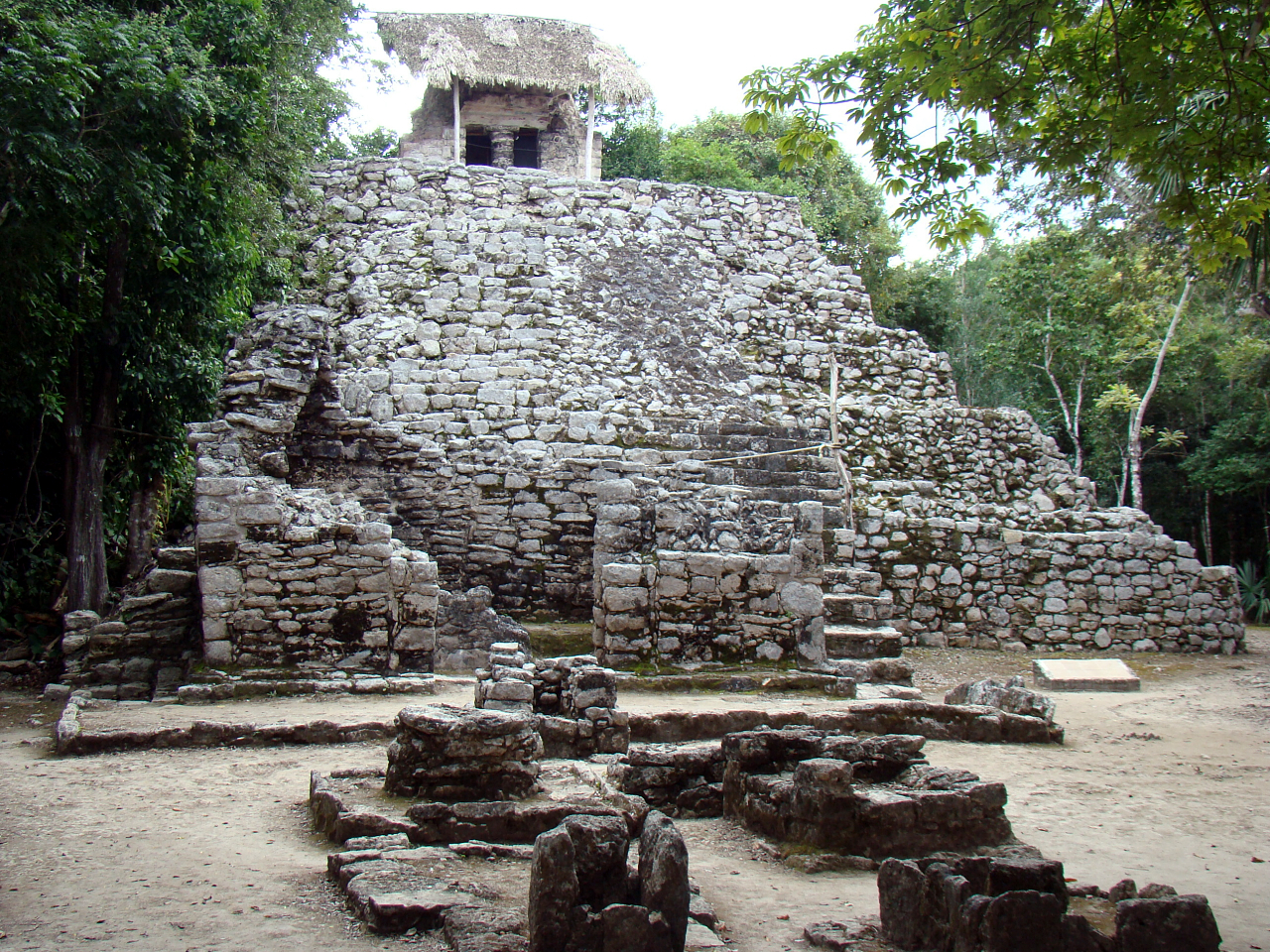
A pyramid in Cobá

Chichen Itza would eventually become the largest city in Yucatan with a population of at least 50,000 people. Almost as many people as lived in Coba during the classic period.

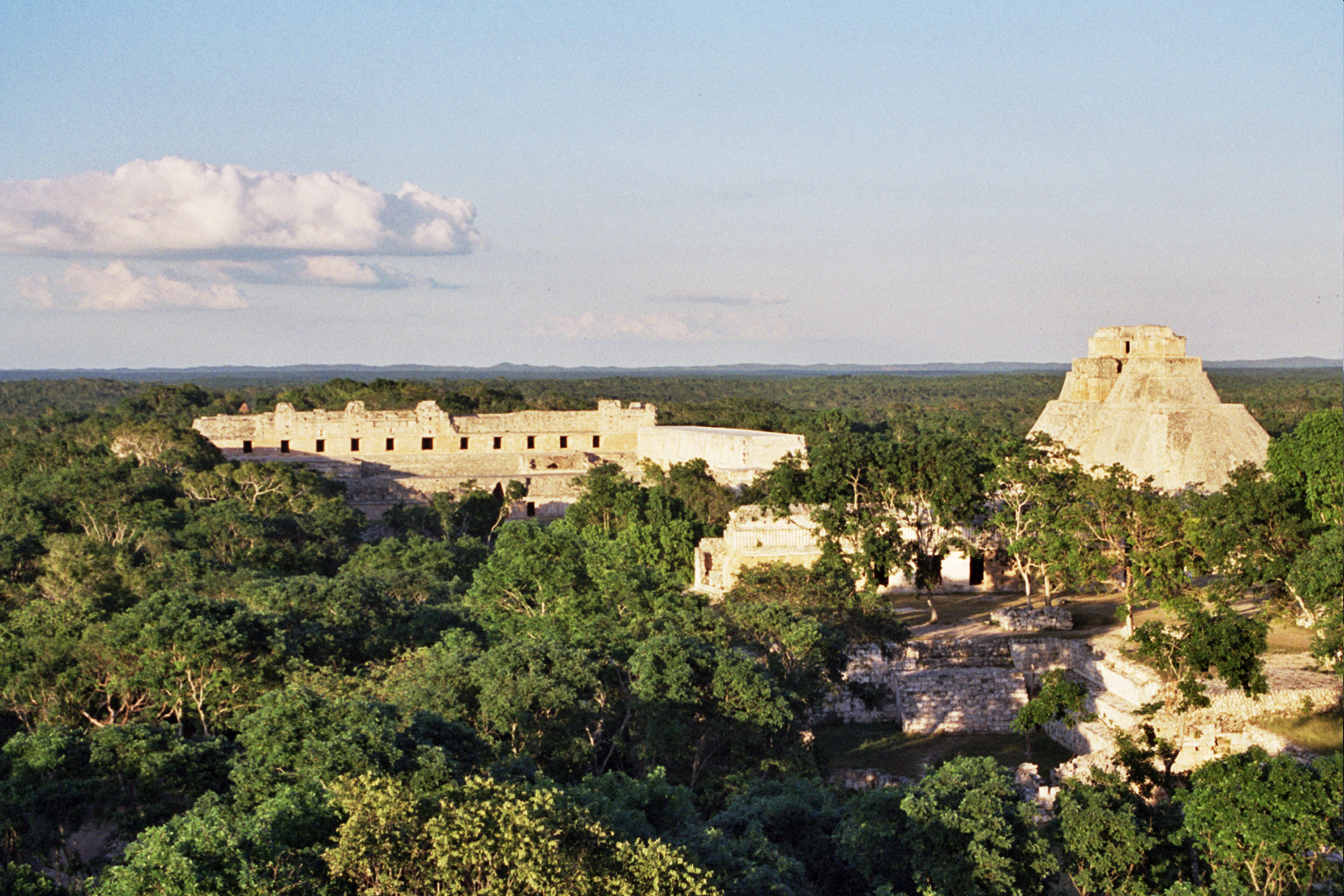
Uxmal

In the mid-eighth century, the Classic Maya civilization began to collapse. Around 925, about the same the time in which the Toltecs began to migrate to the Maya area, most of the major Maya cities in the Yucatán Peninsula had already been abandoned due to food shortages and peasant revolts. Some Maya cities in the Yucatan peninsula at the time were:

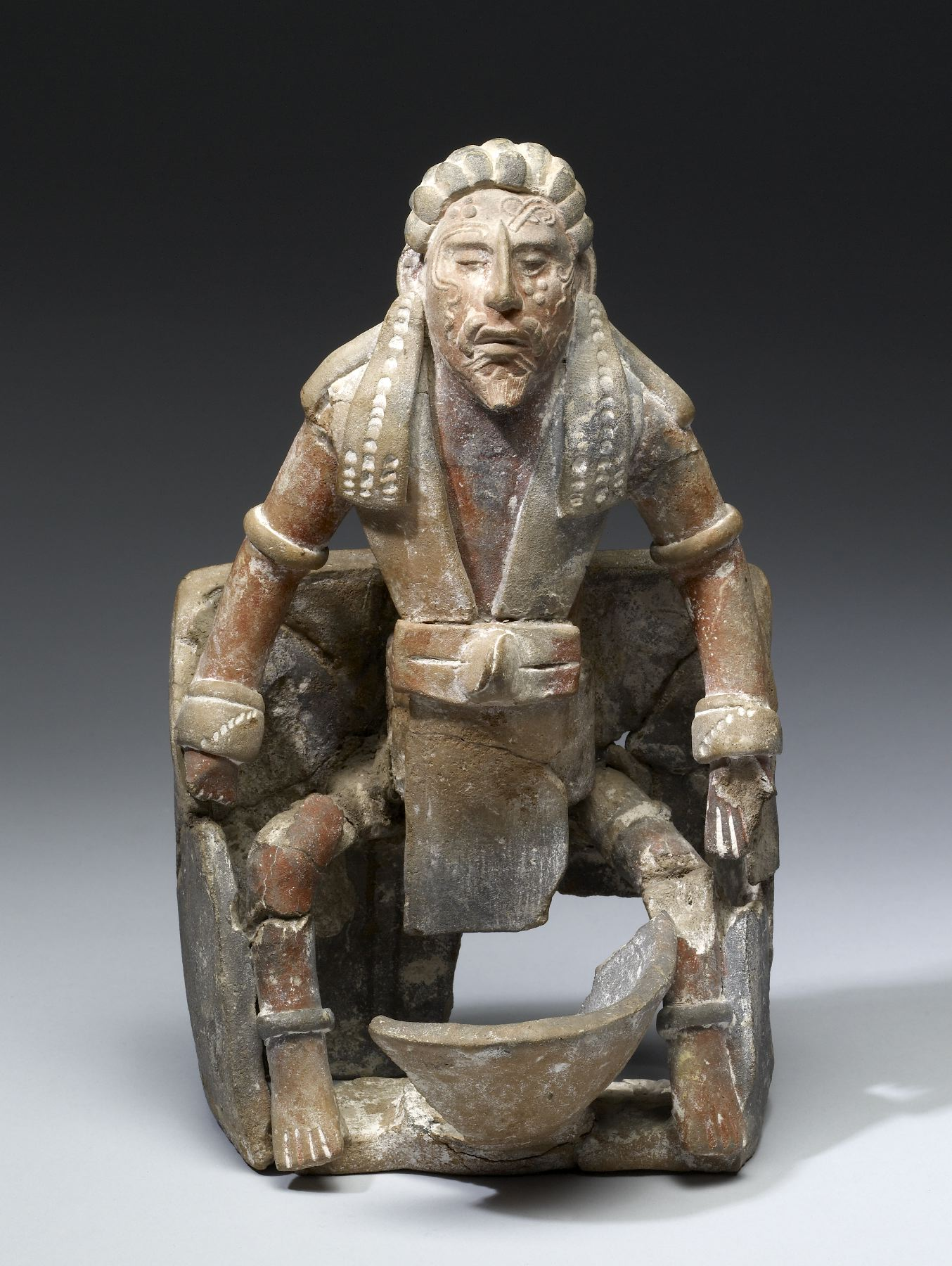
A seated man from Isla Jaina

- Uxmal
- Jaina (a small city on an island in marshland on the coast of the gulf of Mexico)
- Xtampak
- Izamal
- Dzibilchaltun
- Edzna
- Calakmul
- Sayil
- Kabah
- Muyil
- Zama
- Mayapan
- Ek' Balam (capitol of the Kingdom of Talol)

=== Guerrero ===
Archaeological evidence of Toltec influence has been posited in several parts of Guerrero, such as the Costas Chica and Grande (Zacatula and El Infiernillo), the Montaña (Texmelincan and Cualác), and the Chilpancingo valley (Pezuapan). This may be the result of the spread of Toltec commerce and ideology.

=== Chupícuaro ===
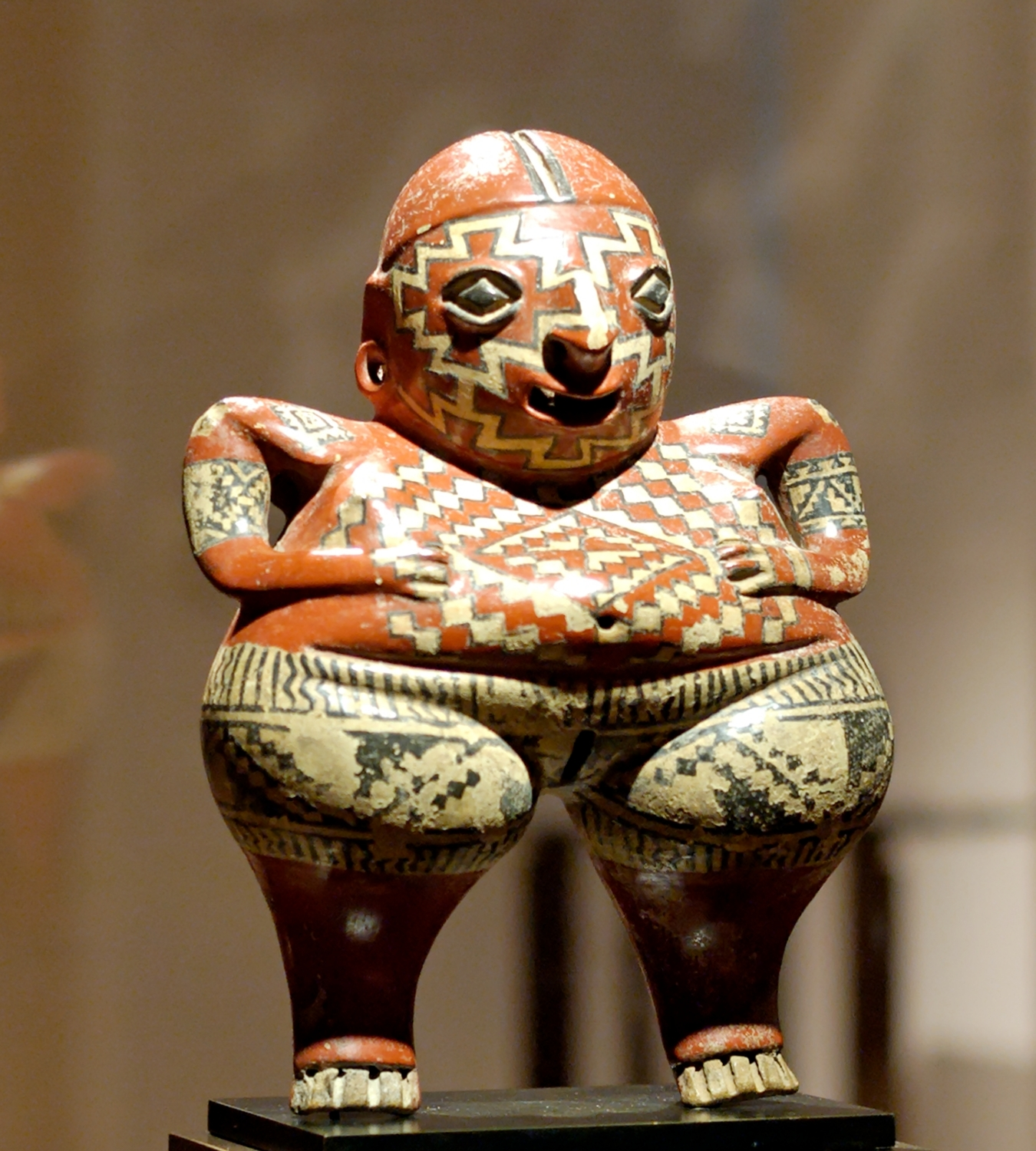
A statuette from Chupícuaro

The Chupícuaro culture was influential in the area, and may have spread to the southwestern United States around 500 BCE. There are theories that the first inhabitants of Guanajuato belonged to this culture. The city of Chupícuaro was inhabited between 800 BCE and 1200 CE. Chupícuaro developed in a vast territory in Guanajuato, Michoacán, Guerrero, Mexico State, Hidalgo, Colima, Nayarit, Querétaro and Zacatecas.

== Warfare ==
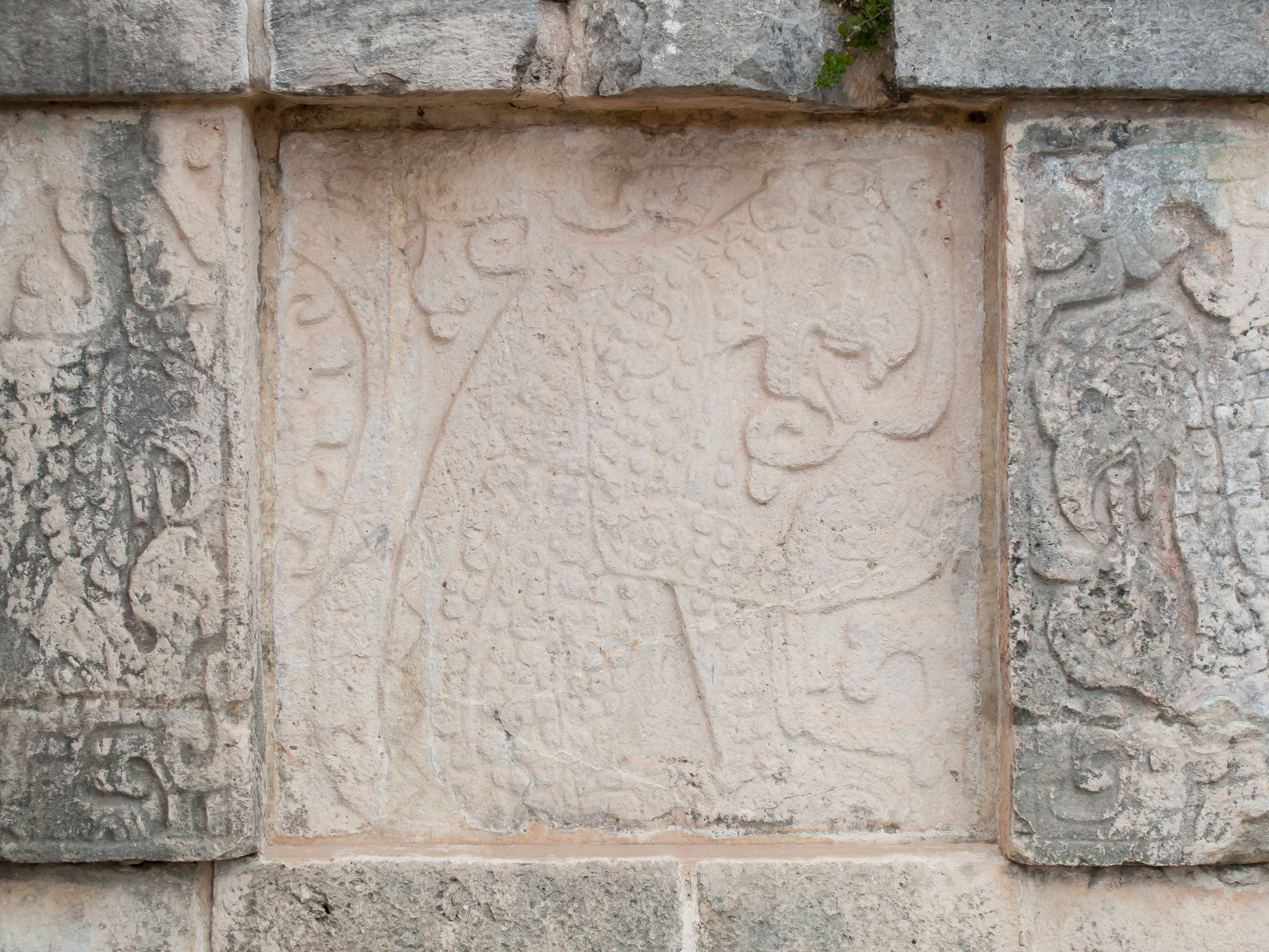
A relief of a jaguar in Chichen Itza

The Toltec were skilled in battle, ferocious and highly trained. A standing army, garrisons, forts and reserve units comprised a formidable weapon against inhabitants of regions coveted by the Toltec and against enemies. Because of their skill and their bravery in battle, the Toltec were able to instill enough awe and respect among their neighbors that cities such as Tula could be built without heavy defenses incorporated into their design. Coyote, Jaguar, and eagle were some of the higher ranks of the Toltec military.

The upper ranks of the Toltec army wore cotton armor, heavily padded to deflect enemy, arrows and spears, with breastplates, in the form of coyotes, jaguars or eagles if the warrior belonged to the order of one of these animal totems. A round shield was carried into battle, and the swords were fastened with belts. A short kilt protected the lower half of the torso, and the legs and ankles were covered with sandals and straps. Quetzal plumes decorated warriors' helmets, and skins, plumage and other materials probably were used as emblems of the particular god or order that they served. The fact that the warriors depicted wore nose ornaments indicates that they were of noble rank. Some of the warriors wore beards.

== See also ==
- Mesoamerica

== Bibliography ==
- Bolt, Jutta, Robert Inklaar, Herman de Jong and Jan Luiten van Zanden (2018). "Maddison Project Database, version 2018".
