= Xicotepec =

- Municipality and town
- Xicotepec de Juárez
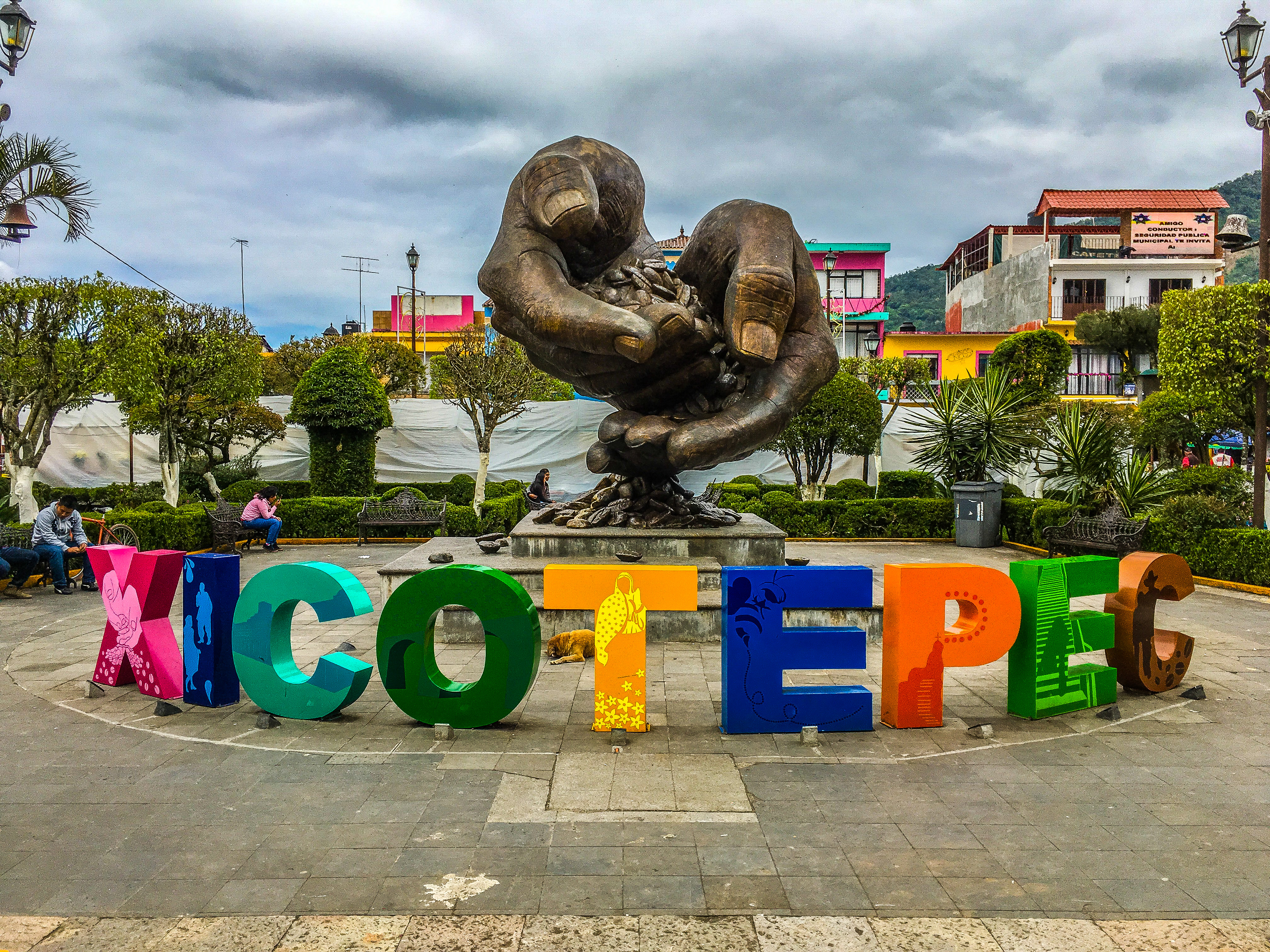

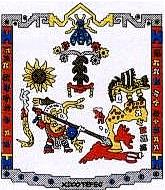
- Coat of arms

- Location of the municipality in Puebla
- Coordinates: 20°18′00″N 97°58′00″O
- Country: Mexico
- State: Puebla

Government
  - Mayor: Laura Guadalupe Vargas Vargas (2018-2021)
- Elevation: 1,180 m (3,870 ft)

Population (2020)
  - Total: 80,591
  - Town: 41,455
- Time zone: UTC-6 (Zona Centro)
- Area code: 764

Xicotepec (in Nahuatl: xico; tepetl, 'jicote or bumblebee; hill' 'Hill of jicotes'') is one of the 217 municipalities that make up the Mexican state of Puebla in central-eastern Mexico. It is located within the Sierra Norte de Puebla and belongs to the first region of the state. Its head is the city of Xicotepec de Juárez, which has been recognized by the Mexico's Secretary of Tourism as one of the 121 pueblos mágicos (magical towns) in the country since 2012.

== History ==
It is said that the first expeditionaries of this place were the Olmecs, who found on these lands a depression that seemed adequate to raise their ceremonial center; torrential rains, its special topography, the confluence of two rivers and dense vegetation made it the ideal place to live.

A Huastec warrior named Cuextécatl fought and expelled the Olmecs, withdrawing them to the coast, thus the Huastecs took possession of the place. This place gained importance and was categorized as ceremonial center, which came to satisfy the religious needs of the inhabitants of a vast region, from Teotihuacan to the coast of the Gulf of Mexico, and also encouraged the emergence of human settlements in the area, allowing the confluence of various ethnic groups.

Other versions indicate that the first inhabitants established within the region were Otomi groups, which settled approximately in 300 B.C.E. Later, during the 5th century, these lands were inhabited by Totonac settlers from El Tajín.

Towards the year 1120, the region was conquered by Huemac, ruler of the Toltec people, which makes it a manor, five months later Chichimec tribes appropriated the place, remaining for more than forty years, until it was reconquered by Metlaltoyuca in 1162.

Approximately in 1325 the Acolhua tribe, led by Tlachotla, invaded the territory and integrated it into their manor.

In 1432 the territory was tributary of Texcoco. Nezahualcóyotl appointed the Xicotepec manor to Quetzalpatzin. Xicotepec belonged to the Aztec strategic province of Huauchinango, and by the sixteenth century, had either 17 or 24 subject towns.

== Coat of arms ==
The glyph is an indigenous drawing from Nahuatl origin that shows two main figures; the green shape represents a hill, and on top of it a representation of a jicote.

It is necessary to clarify that the glyph is the graphic representation of the meaning name given to the city, therefore, it implies that Xicotepec is the hill of the jicotes (or bumblebees).

== Geography ==
Villa Ávila Camacho, also known as La Ceiba, is a town that lies in the northeast of the municipality, on the banks of the Río San Marcos. Another nearby attraction is the Tlaxcalantongo Falls, by the town of the same name.

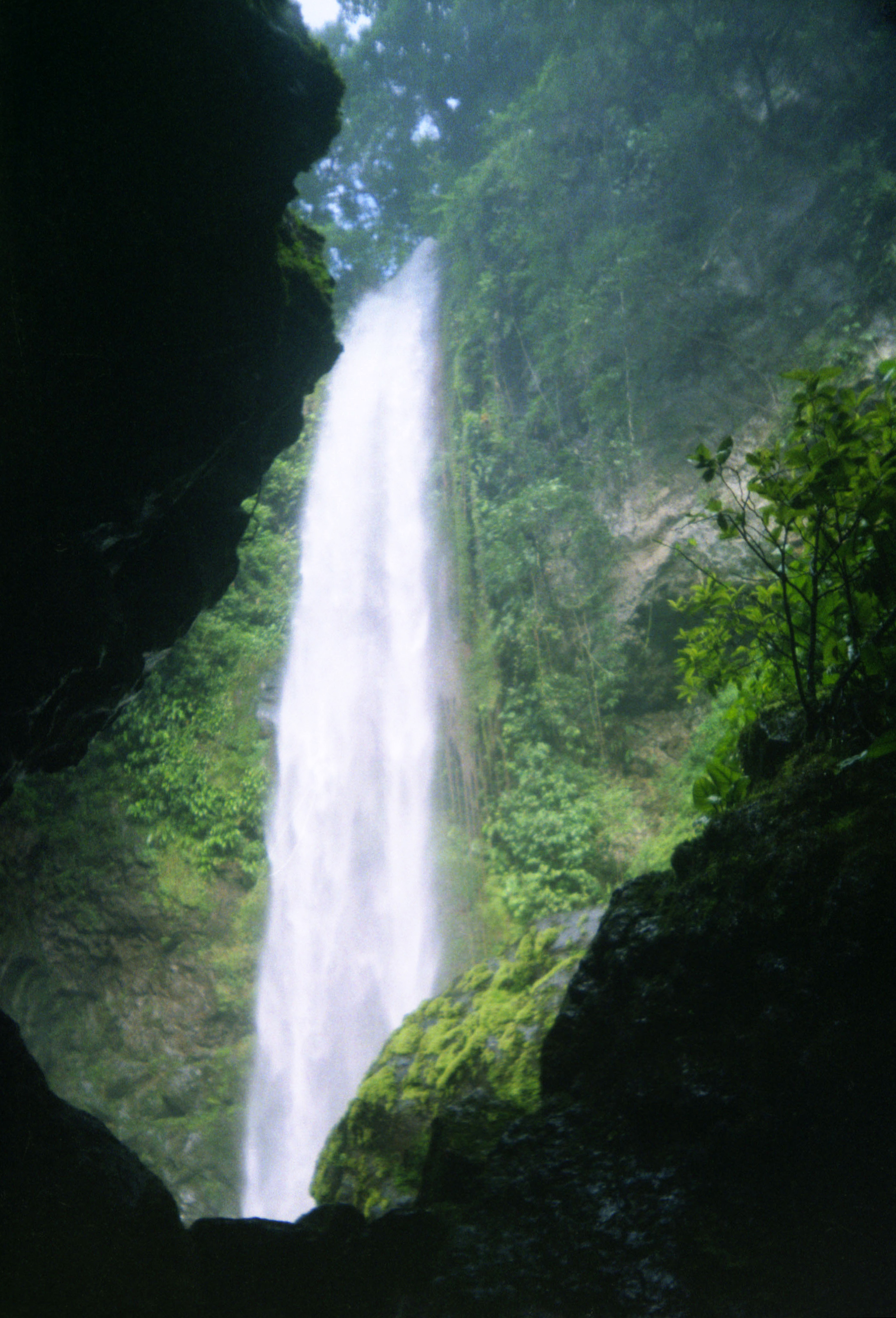
Tlaxcolotongo Falls
