= Aguamiel =

Sap of Mexican plant

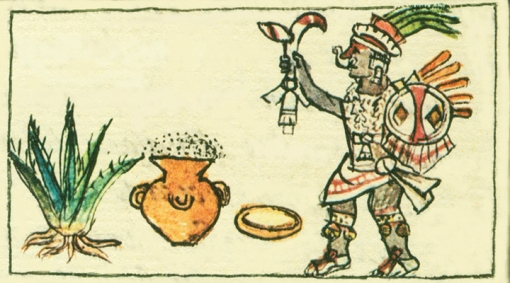
From the Codex Borbonicus or Códice Borbónico (1530s Spanish calendar and outline of life in the New World) showing Mayahuel, goddess of the maguey, with a mature agave and a pot of fermented pulque. The first liquid that oozes into the heart of the maguey is aguamiel, believed to be Mayahuel's blood

Aguamiel [aɣwaˈmjel] (literally agua "water" miel "honey") is the sap of the Mexican maguey plant which is believed to have therapeutic qualities. According to Native American histories, the process of obtaining aguamiel from maguey was first discovered during the reign of Tecpancaltzin (c. 990–1042) by a Toltec noble named Papantzin, whose daughter Xochitl was sent to the king with an offering of aguamiel. The sap is found in abundance among the agave plants which grow among the ruins of the Teotihuacan civilization. Also called honeywater it has been used in Mexico as a medicine. In its fermented state it has been enjoyed as a beverage for centuries. The particularly viscous beer made from Aguamiel is known as pulque in Mexico. It was available commercially beginning in 1910 and its sale was emphasized only in California prior to late 1928.

An individual maguey plant can produce about 1000L of aguamiel over the course of three to six months. Over the course of the production period, the volume of aguamiel varies from about 0.4L/day at the beginning and end of production, to about 4–6L/day at the peak. It is obtained from the agave plant through cutting a growing, flowering stock, which releases the agave's sweet sap. After the plant is cut, sap can be harvested from the plant for up to two months.

Aguamiel was distributed by the Agmel Products Corporation prior to the company's acquisition by Zonite Products Corporation in March 1928. It could be obtained only in certain areas of Mexico and would spoil quickly. Aguamiel's use was not widespread until a rigorous process of concentration was developed.

== See also ==
- Agave nectar
