= Cē Ācatl Topiltzin =

Ce Acatl Topiltzin
- Quetzalcōātl
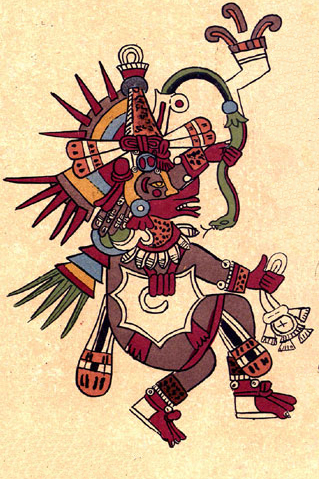
- Topiltzin as Quetzalcoatl

Emperor of the Toltecs
- Reign: 923–947
- Predecessor: Xōchitl
- Successor: Matlacxochtli
- Born: 13 May 895; Tepoztlán, Toltec Empire
- Died: 947; Tlapallan, Gulf of Mexico
- Father: Mīxcōātl
- Mother: Chīmalmā
- Religion: Toltec religion

Cē Ācatl Topiltzin Quetzalcōātl [seː ˈaːkat͡ɬ toˈpilt͡sin ket͡salˈkoːʷaːt͡ɬ] (Our Prince One-Reed Precious Serpent) (13 May 895–947) is a mythologised figure appearing in 16th-century accounts of Nahua historical traditions. He is identified as a Toltec ruler in the 10th century by the Aztec tradition, which saw the Toltec people as their ruling predecessor of the region several centuries before the Aztecs settled on the central high plateau of Mexico.

In later generations, he was a cultural hero and figure of legend often confused or conflated with the important Mesoamerican deity Quetzalcoatl. According to legend in El Salvador, the city of Cuzcatlán (the capital city of the Pipil/Cuzcatlecs) was founded by the exiled Toltec Ce Acatl Topiltzin. Maarten Jansen identifies Topiltzin with the ruler Four Jaguar depicted in Mixtec codices.

== Story ==
Topiltzin Cē Ācatl Quetzalcōatl was the Lord of the Toltecs and their major city Tōllan.

One version of the story is that he was born in the 10th century, during the year and day-sign "1 Acatl," correlated to date May 23 of the year 671, allegedly in what is now the town of Tepoztlán. According to various sources, he had four different possible fathers, the most popular of which is Mixcōatl ("Cloud Serpent"), the god of war, fire, and the hunt, and presumably also an earlier Toltec king—Mesoamerican leaders and high-priests sometimes took the names of the deity who was their patron. His mother is at times unnamed, but Chimalman is the most accepted.

There exist few accounts of Ce Acatl's early childhood. However, all information agrees that he proved his worth first as a warrior and then as a priest to the people of Tollan.

He assumed lordship over the Toltecs and migrated his people to Tollan. Reigning in peace and prosperity he contributed much to the lifestyle of the Toltecs with basic ideas such as civilization. He was generally considered a god upon earth by his followers with similar powers to those of his namesake. According to legend, the most accepted fate of the man-god was that during the year "1 Acatl" or 947, and at the age of 53 he migrated to Tlapallan on the Gulf coast, where he took a canoe and burned himself.

He dispelled the traditions of the past and ended all human sacrifice during his reign. The translations claim that he loved his people so much he insisted that they only meet the ancient standards of the gods; he had the Toltec offer them snakes, birds and other animals, but not humans, as sacrifices. To prove his penance, to atone for the earlier sins of his people, and to appease the debt owed to the gods (created by lack of tribute of human blood) he also created the cult of the serpent. This cult insisted that the practitioners bleed themselves to satiate the needs of the netherworld. It also demanded that all priests remain celibate and did not allow intoxication of any kind (representing the two major sins to which the original 400 Mixcohua succumbed). These edicts and his personal purity of spirit caused Topiltzin Quetzalcoatl to be beloved by his vassals and revered for generations. The representation of the priestly ruler became so important that subsequent rulers would claim direct descent from Topiltzin Quetzalcoatl in order to legitimize their monarchies.

Once he left Tollan, the name was used by other elite figures to keep a line of succession and was also used by the Mexica to more easily rule over the Toltecs.

According to the Florentine Codex, which was written under the direction of the Franciscan missionary Bernardino de Sahagún, the Aztecs had a legend that Quetzalcoatl would one day return, and Emperor Moctezuma II mistook Hernán Cortés for Quetzalcoatl. Other parties have also propagated the idea that the Native Americans believed the conquerors to be gods: most notably the historians of the Franciscan order such as Fray Geronimo Mendieta (Martínez 1980). Some Franciscans at this time held millennarian beliefs (Phelan 1956), and the natives taking the Spanish conquerors for gods was an idea that went well with this theology.

Some scholars still hold the view that the fall of the Aztec empire can in part be attributed to Moctezuma's belief in Cortés as the returning Quetzalcoatl, but most modern scholars see the "Quetzalcoatl/Cortés myth" as one of many myths about the Spanish conquest which originated in the early post-conquest period.

=== Topiltzin's legacy ===
The tales end with Topiltzin traveling across Mesoamerica founding small communities and giving all the features their respective names. The Aztecs believed that Topiltzin's search for his holy resting place eventually led him across the sea to the east, from whence he vowed to return one day and reclaim Cholula (Chimalpahin, Motolinia, Ixtlilxochitl, Codice Rios). Other sources insist that Topiltzin Quetzalcoatl would not return but that he would send representatives to warn or possibly pass judgment on those inhabiting the land (Las Casas, Mendieta, Veytia). Aztec rulers used the myth of the great founder of Tollan to help legitimize their claims to seats of power. They claimed that, as the direct descendants of the Priest-King, they had the right and duty to hold his place until the day Topiltzin would return. The myths would prove to have a lasting effect on the Aztec empire. They rationalized the mass sacrifices that were already destabilizing the empire when the first Spaniards arrived. The stories of Topiltzin further expedited the collapse of the Aztec nation by sheer coincidence; they described him as having an incredible likeness to the Spaniards. The Aztec may have truly believed that they were seeing the return of the famous priest when the white-skinned Hernán Cortés landed on their shores in 1519. He came from across the sea to the east, wearing brilliant armor (like that which the deity Quetzalcoatl is often shown wearing), accompanied by four men (possibly believed to be the other four progenitors of the Mesoamerican people that survived the massacre before coming to earth as Topiltzin’s messengers). The Spanish arrival terrified the ruling class. They feared they would be exposed as frauds and, at the very least, lose their ruling status to Topiltzin. Conversely the oppressed Aztec people, taxed and forced to wage war for sacrifices, hoped that these arrivals would bring a new era of peace and enlightenment (Carrasco 2000:145-152). Ultimately the Aztecs' rulers still lost their status and the Aztec people were not freed from oppression.

As the Spanish conquered Mesoamerica they destroyed countless works concerning and pre-dating the Aztecs, and the story of Topiltzin Quetzalcoatl was almost lost. Only relatively recently have accurate translations of much of the information about Topiltzin been made available. Unfortunately, even the comparatively complete accounts are but a portion of the story. Much of the information varies from region to region and has changed through the course of time (as myths are apt to do).

== Regalia ==
Topiltzin Quetzalcoatl is usually seen with a plumed headpiece, a curved baton (the chicoacolli) and a feather rimmed shield with the ehecacozcatl (wind jewel) emblem on it.

== Sources ==
Five major sources discuss the mythical history and origin of Topiltzin Quetzalcoatl. While the stories provided by these sources may conflict somewhat, they provide insight into the different uses of the name Quetzalcoatl.

=== Historia de los Mexicanos por sus pinturas ===
The first source was produced by an unknown Spaniard which was later named the Historia de los Mexicanos por sus pinturas. This version was copied from a pre-Hispanic text around 1531 and could possibly be the oldest recreation of the codices. It is also considered to be the briefest translation.

In this version, the deeds of Quetzalcoatl's (here named Ce Acatl) father, the war god Mixcoatl (here named Camaxtli), are highlighted. It explains how Mixcoatl meets the unknown mother, who dies after giving birth to Ce Acatl. Once Ce Acatl emerges from manhood, he spends seven years upon the mountains offering penance (for his sins) to the gods and performs ritual bloodletting asking the gods to make him a great warrior—ritual bloodletting by rulers was long a feature of Mesoamerican religions. Once this time passes, he begins to wage war and becomes the leader of Tollan and the Toltecs.

His reign is peaceful and productive, lasting 42 years. Within the last four years, the known archenemy of Quetzalcoatl, Tezcatlipoca (although it is not specified in this version), tells him he must leave in four years to Tlapallan to die.

Thus, in four years, Quetzacoatl leaves, but takes his adoring Toltecs with him. Stopping at many different villages along the way, he leaves some of his people behind at each one until he arrives at Tlapallan where he dies the next day. Somewhat unusual to this version is the epilogue of how Tollan does not find a leader for some years after. Tollan is later conquered and all the Toltecs are sacrificed. As mentioned before, this version is brief, most probably due to the Spaniards' inability to fully translate the text, or alternatively the lack of interest in relaying the story in its entirety.

=== Libro de oro y tesoro indico ===
The second translations were written by a group of Franciscan friars in 1532 and translated from original text. They are known collectively as the Libro de oro y tesoro indico. In the friars' translation Topiltzin is the son of Totepeuh, who is the leader of Teocolhuacan.

His brother-in-law kills his father but after building a temple for his father, Topiltzin gets his revenge. The migration to Tollan and later to Tlapallan is involved, but this time he is told to go by Tezcatlipoca. The reason for this is because the King would not allow what Tezcatlipoca wanted, human sacrifice. So he leaves, as in the previous version, with his Toltec in tow.

=== Work by Andre Thevet ===
This third translation, which is written by French cosmographer André de Thevet, was translated from a lost Spanish version in the sixteenth century. In this version, Quetzalcoatl is son to Camaxtli and Chimalman; his mother still died after birth. This time, he has brothers who are bent on killing him, but he eludes them twice. After they kill their father, he kills them in a series of side stories. He becomes the ruler, migrates to Tollan, and is believed to be a sorcerer god ruling for 160 years.

Later, he encounters Tezcatlipoca once again, who is jealous of the Toltecs' adoration for their god, and so drives out the lesser god from Tollan. During this time Quetzalcoatl and a few of his people visit many of the villages mentioned as well as others. In many of these villages he remained the chief god for centuries.

Two endings exist: in one, Tezcatlipoca follows him into the desert and the smoke that rises from his dead body creates Venus. In the other, he simply flees to Tlapallan once again. This translation is probably the most comprehensive version, because of the slight variations that are not seen in the others.

=== Leyenda de los soles ===
A Nahua native wrote the fourth translation, the Leyenda de los soles. It's very similar to the first translation, but it gives an in-depth account of Mixcoatl's adventures especially his meeting with Quetzalcoatl's mother. It also states that Quetzalcoatl is supernatural and godlike.

=== Historia general de las cosas de Nueva España ===
This final major translation was done by a Franciscan friar who compiled from native informants an extensive set of texts—collectively known as the Florentine Codex—involving the Mesoamerican pantheon. The lengthy Spanish-language version, Historia general de las cosas de Nueva España by Fray Bernardino de Sahagún, gives a unique look at Topiltzin Quetzalcoatl and his subjects' lifestyle. The core structure of the tale is the same - Quetzalcoatl is a mage-god ruling Tollan with his knowledge and wisdom passed onto the Toltecs. In this version, Tollan resembles a utopia with beautiful buildings and flora where the people were content with every aspect of life.

Tezcatlipoca come along and forces Quetzalcoatl out. Quetzalcoatl then transforms Tollan into a normal city. Along his travels, Quetzalcoatl and some of his followers are involved in many stories before they reach Tlapallan.

== See also ==
- List of people from Morelos
