= Xochitl (Toltec) =

- Empress of the Toltecs
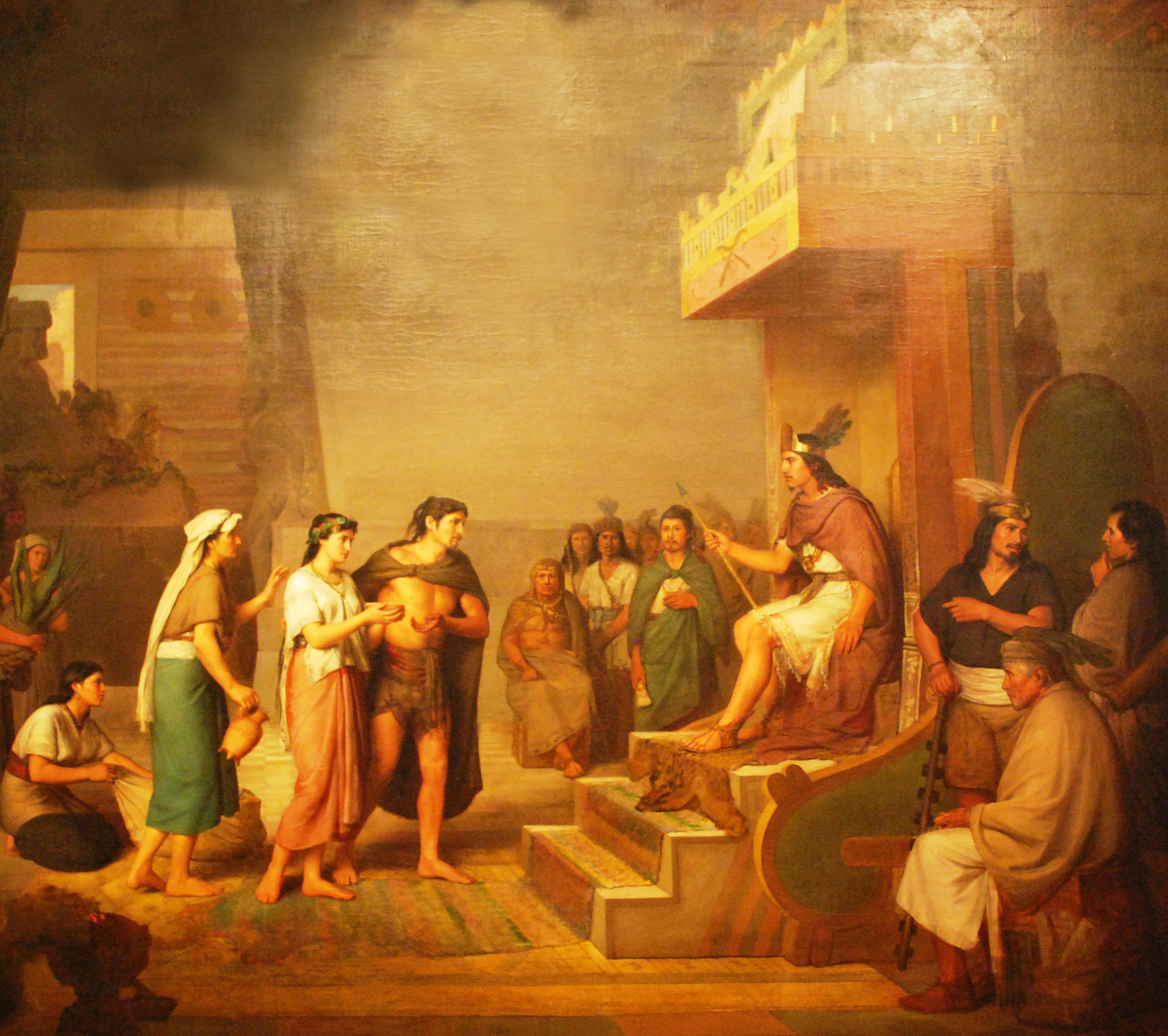
- "The Discovery of Pulque", by José María Obregón; Xochitl is in white carrying bowl
- Reign: 877–916
- Predecessor: Tecpancaltzin Iztaccaltzin
- Successor: Cē Ācatl Topiltzin QuetzalCoatl
- Born: Before 877; Toltec Empire
- Died: 916; Toltec Empire
- Spouse: Tecpancaltzin Iztaccaltzin
- Father: Papantzin
- Mother: Unknown
- Religion: Toltec religion

Xochitl (Nahuatl pronunciation: [ˈʃoːtʃitɬ], pronunciation r. 877–916) was a Toltec empress consort and wife of Tecpancaltzin Iztaccaltzin. Her existence beyond legend is questionable, and accounts of her life are mainly based on the writings of indigenous historian Fernando de Alva Ixtlilxochitl.

== Biography ==
Xochitl was a mistress of the Toltec Emperor Tecpancaltzin, bearing him a son. (Tecpancaltzin had only daughters by his first wife, Maxio). After Maxio died, Xochitl became recognized as empress. Her son became heir and was known as Topiltzin-Meconetzin.

When she was elderly, civil war erupted in the Toltec Empire. Xochitl called upon other women to join her in battle, and created and led a battalion composed entirely of women soldiers. She died on the battlefield. The son of Xochitl and Tecpancaltzin, Topiltzin, was the last of the Toltec kings, before he was overthrown in the civil war. It was during the final stand of the Toltecs at Tultitlan that Tecpancaltzin and Xochitl were slain in battle.

== Depiction in art ==
A well-known painting of Xochitl and Tecpancaltzin, El descubrimiento del pulque, was completed in 1869 by Mexican artist José Obregón. Obregón was trained, and painted in, a classical style popular in the 19th century. El descubrimiento del pulque is based on historian Fernando de Alva Ixtlilxochitl's description of Xochitl as a beautiful virgin brought to Tecpancaltzin by her father, Papatzin. Papatzin was a Toltec noble, and a cultivator of maguey plants, also called agave plants and related to aloe. Xochitl presented to Tecpancaltzin a drink that she and/or her father invented, pulque, made from the honey of maguey. The painting was part of a cultural rise in Mexican nationalism during the period, yet the influence of classical European art symbolism appears throughout the painting.

More recently, Xochitl appears as one of the 999 women included in American artist Judy Chicago's installation work, The Dinner Party. Xochitl is named in the Heritage Floor.
