= Xiuhtlaltzin =

Toltec ruler (r. 979–983)

- Tlatoani
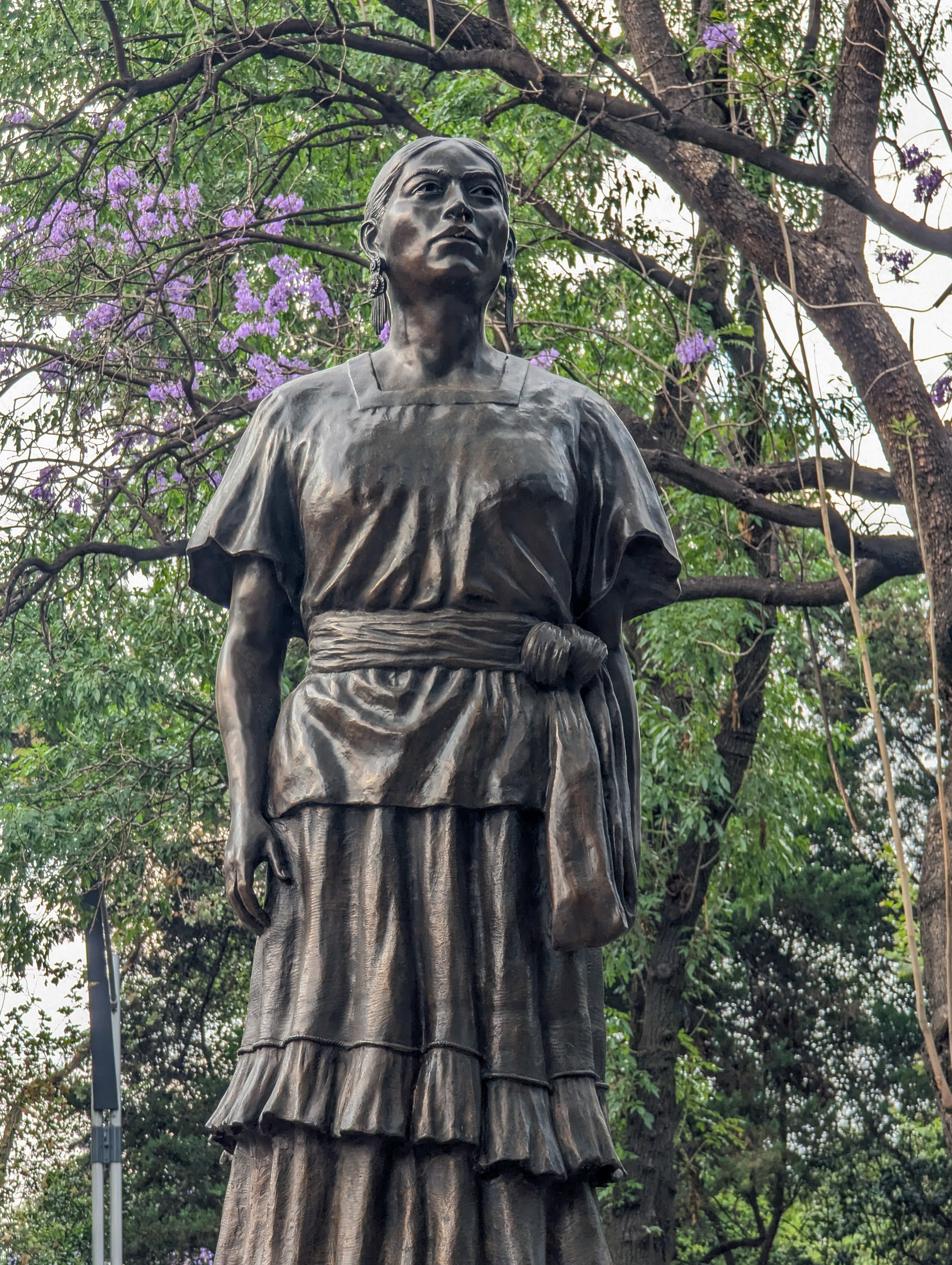
- Sculpture of Xiuhtlatzin on the Paseo de las Heroínas along Paseo de la Reforma, Mexico City.
- Reign: 979–983
- Predecessor: Mitl
- Successor: Tecpancaltzin or Matlaccoatl
- Born: Toltec Empire
- Died: Tula, Toltec Empire
- Burial: Temple of the Frog God
- Spouse: Mitl
- Issue: Tecpancaltzin
- Mother: Unknown
- Religion: Toltec religion

Xiuhtlaltzin (Note: Her name has also been given as Xiuhcaltzin, Xiuhquentzin, Xiuhtlatzin, Xiuhtzaltzin, or Xiutlaltzin.) (r. 979–983) was the seventh Tlatoani, or ruler of the Toltec Empire. She succeeded her husband, Mitl as the empire's first and only queen regnant. Her reign lasted four years.

== Biography ==
Xiuhtlaltzin was born in the 10th century in the Toltec Empire. Her name translates from Nahuatl as "Flower of the Little Earth". She was married to Mitl, the sixth Tlatoani of the empire. In 979, upon either his death or the end of his 52-year reign, Xiuhtlaltzin became ruler. Toltec law did not allow for women rulers and Xiuhtlaltzin's rule was the only exception in the Toltec patrilineal succession.

Xiuhtlaltzin ruled for four years, until 983. While there is no record of specific events that occurred during her reign, historian Hubert Howe Bancroft wrote that she was known for "showing great zeal and wisdom in the management of public affairs, and dying deeply regretted by all her subjects."

The Anónimo Mexicano states that Xiuhtlaltzin was the seventh ruler, following Mitl. The account says that she ruled for four years and that rule was followed by all the lords ruling together. According to the historian Fray Juan de Torquemada (c. 1562–1624), who was likely familiar with the Anónimo Mexicano, Xiuhtlaltzin's four-year rule was followed by that of Tecpancaltzin (also known as Topiltzin). Other accounts report an interregnum of 48 years following the end of her reign. According to Bancroft, Spanish records indicated that Xiuhtlaltzin was followed by Tecpancaltzin while Nahua records indicated that her son, Matlaccoatl, reigned after her.

Xiuhtlaltzin was buried next to her husband in the Temple of the Frog God in Tula.

== Depictions ==
Mexican author Sandra Sabanero was inspired by the story of Xiuhtlaltzin to write the 2011 novel La Primera Reina Tolteca (The First Toltec Queen).
