= Tecpancaltzin Iztaccaltzin =

- Emperor of the Toltecs
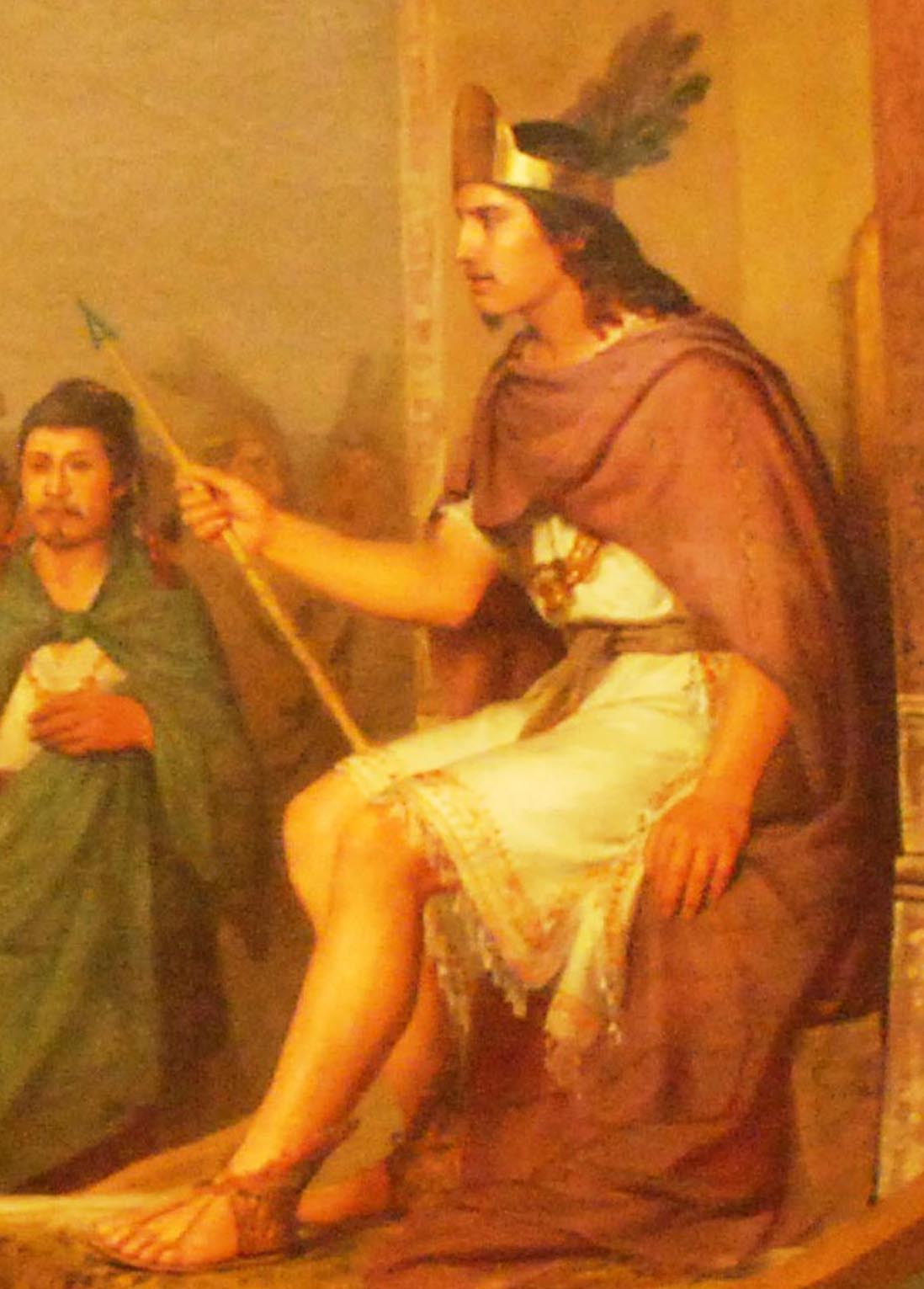
- The Discovery of Pulque by José María Obregón, 1869
- Reign: 833-877
- Predecessor: Xihuiquenitzin Ziuhcaltzin
- Successor: Xochitl
- Born: Before 833; Tula
- Died: 911
- Issue: Micoamazatzin
- Father: Tlacomihua
- Mother: Xihuiquenitzin Ziuhcaltzin
- Religion: Toltec religion

Tecpancaltzin Iztaccaltzin was the ninth Tlatoani, ruler of the Toltec Empire. He began his reign when his mother, Xihuiquenitzin Ziuhcaltzin died in about 833. Dates in Toltec history are not entirely accurate, as the Toltec calendar is not completely understood.

In 843, a Toltec man named Papantzin invented a type of sugar made from the Agave plant. He and his daughter Xochitl brought the sugar as a gift to Tecpancaltzin Iztaccaltzin. Tecpancaltzin fell in love with Xochitl, but she did not share his feelings. He kept her in his palace not allowing her to leave. He convinced Papantzin not to help her by telling him that when Tecpancaltzin died, Xochitl would be the ruler of the Toltecs. They had a son named Meconetzin.

Xochitl threatened to leave in 846 but Tecpancaltzin managed to keep her there by promising Meconetzin would be the next Tlatoani.

Tecpancaltzin Iztaccaltzin was dethroned in 877 or 885, but was probably still alive. After this Xochitl became empress, and after her death Maeconetzin became emperor.
