= Relaciones (Domingo Chimalpain) =

The Eight Relaciones of Chimalpain are a set of manuscripts in Nahuatl, dealing with the history of New Spain and written mostly in the form of annals, written by the Chalca noble around the early 17th century.

Written at different times in no particular sequence, they are generally structured to follow a chronological recounting of various important events, primarily around Chimalpain's home of Chalco and the Valley of Mexico.

They were apparently not meant for publication, and were bound and organized only after Chimalpain's death in 1645. The whole series is now in the National Library of France, catalogued under the name Manuscript mexicain 74 and titled Différentes histoires originales des royaumes de Colhuacan (Note: In English: "Mexican manuscript #74: Miscellaneous histories from the realms of Colhuacan.")

== Overview ==
Though Andrés de Santiago Xochitototzin, a native judge of Amaquemecan, had begun to compile and select different sources to write a history of Chalco, it wasn't until 1620 that such a text had begun its production after Cristóbal de Castañeda had delegated the task to Chimalpain, his nephew through his sister, María Jerónima Xiauhtotzin.

=== First Relación ===
==== First Relación proper ====
A cosmogony, heavily influenced by Christian conception, in addition to commentaries on the state and belief. (Note: 1st through 7th folios.) It is one of two to not follow an annal format.

==== First Insert on Amaquemecan ====
Perhaps written around 1665 by Miguel Quetzalmazatzin, here the author delineates the borders of the eponymous altepetl. (Note: 8th folio.)

=== Second Relación ===
==== Second Relación proper ====
A chronicle, running from the year 3 b.c.e. through 50 c.e., (Note: 9th through 14th folios.) of how the Teochichimeca reached Aztlan-Teocolhuacan, along with a description of the geographical provinces of the Earth, describing the New World as a particularly privileged and abundant land.

==== Memorial breve acerca de la fundación de la ciudad de Colhuacán ====
Likely the last of Chimalpain's own texts, it's a long (Note: 15th through the front (recto) of the 67th folio.) compendium of events surrounding Colhuacan, from its founding in 670 through the arrival of several chichimec groups and the establishment of the Triple Alliance, ending in 1299 with the end of huehue Huitzilihuitl's reign and life.

==== Second Insert on Amaquemecan ====
Written by the same author of the first insert, now in 1667, it deals with a land concession in the year 1300. (Note: Back (verso) of folio 67.)

=== Third Relación ===
Consisting of a single section (Note: Folios 68 through 115.) (as do the rest hereon), it describes the origins and history of the Mexicah, from their first moments in Aztlan until the end of the Triple Alliance.

=== Fourth Relación ===
On the history of both the people (totolimpaneca, tlacochcalca, acxoteca and tenanca) and nobility of Chalco, from the years 50 to 1241 C.E. (Note: 116th through 122nd folios.)

=== Fifth Relación ===
Continuation of the previous text, now dealing mostly with the totolimpaneca and tenanca, from 1269 through 1334 C.E. (Note: 123rd through 138th folios.)

=== Sixth Relación ===
Overlapping with the very end of the previous section, (Note: 139th through 144th folios.) here Chimalpain recounts the chichimec's departure from Xicco and the following 3 1/2 centuries, concluding with the death of Spanish queen Margaret of Austria and the mass at Tlalmanalco in her honour, on the 29th of April, 1612.

It also includes the genealogy of Cuauhcececuittzin Tlamaoccatlteuctli Teocuitlapane, tlahtoani of Panohuayan Amaquemecan.

=== Seventh Relación ===
Written in 1629, it begins with a bible-derived version to the origin of the Tlacochcalca chichimecs, and follows them through the founding of Chalco in 1272 until the land grant of 1591 to the franciscans in front of St. Hippolytus Hospital, now commonly known as the Church of St. Judas Thaddeus.

The text (Note: 145th through 144th folios.) generally focuses more on Tlalmanalco and the surrounding altepetl until its conquest in 1465 by the Triple Alliance, after which the text shifts to recording the history of the capital, of Mexico-Tenochtitlan.

=== Eighth Relación ===
Though placed after the Seventh, (Note: 225th through 272nd folios.) it was written some 9 years before it, in 1620. The latter of the two which do not follow the overarching annal format, it describes the genealogy of Domingo Hernández Ayopochtzin, and his relationship to the royal house of Tenanco.

Chimalpain here comments on his sources and the method through which he acquired them.

He ends the texts by describing the role of women in Chalco and the Valley, noting how it was through the women's lineage that legitimacy was acquired, comparing this and other systems and habits with those of the Spanish nobility, briefly commenting on their history.
