= José María Obregón =

Mexican painter (1832–1902)

Jose Maria Obregón (1832 in Mexico City – 1902 in Mexico City) was a Mexican painter of the Romanticism movement, best remembered for pioneering Mexican muralism and the representation of Indigenous peoples of Mexico in art. He attended the Academy of San Carlos, and his works are preserved in the collections of the Museo Nacional de Arte and the National Palace of Mexico.
