= Tlillan-Tlapallan =

Tlillan-Tlapallan [ˈt͡ɬilːan t͡ɬaˈpalːan], or simply Tlapallan, is a legendary place on the coast of Mexico mentioned in Aztec mythology. When the divine lord Quetzalcoatl was afflicted by old age and illness, and outraged at the violence of the trickster Titlacuahan, he fled to Tlapallan. From there he sailed away on a raft of snakes. The source says,

"And this is how he went away, sailing over the sea. And it is not known how... he reached this place Tlapallan." (General History of the Things of New Spain, Book 3, chapter 14)

This story can be found in Bernardino de Sahagún's General History of the Things of New Spain - which is the most authentic source of Aztec mythology, having been compiled shortly after the conquest in collaboration with a group of Aztec elders .

The Historia de los Mexicanos por sus pinturas places Tlillan-Tlapallan in Campeche or Yucatán.
