= Huemac =

Legendary Toltec king

In Mexica legendary tradition, Huemac (fl. c. 11th century), also spelled Hueymac or Huehmac, is described as being the last king of the (equally legendary and semi-mythical) Toltec state before the fall of Tula/Tōllān.

His name is traditionally translated as "Big Hand", but other scholars maintain the more succinct translation is "Big Gift".

All information about this figure stems from Aztec literature written centuries later. As with just about everything to do with the 'Toltecs', whom the Aztecs and other central Mexican cultures of the Postclassic era held up as their valiant precursors whose legacy and authority they inherited, actual and discernible historical data is scant. A number of contemporary Mesoamerican studies question whether the Toltec existed as a coherent state or group at all, and likewise whether Huemac was an actual historical figure remains highly debatable.

After the fall of the Toltec capital, Huemac traveled for some years with a diminishing band of followers, and then died in a cave at Chapultepec, today part of Mexico City. The date of his death, from various accounts and attempts to correlate them with the Gregorian calendar, ranges from the 1090s to the 1170s.
