= Cerro de la Estrella =

Cerro de la Estrella (English: Star Hill) may refer to:

- Cerro de la Estrella, Mexico City a 2,613 m high mountain in Mexico City
  - Cerro de la Estrella (archaeological site)
  - Cerro de la Estrella National Park
  - Cerro de la Estrella metro station, a metro station in Mexico City
- Cerro de la Estrella, Sierra Morena, a 1,298 m high mountain in Sierra Morena, Spain
