= Pueblo Culhuacán =

Coordinates: 19°20′22.35″N 99°6′28.18″W

- Neighborhood of Mexico City
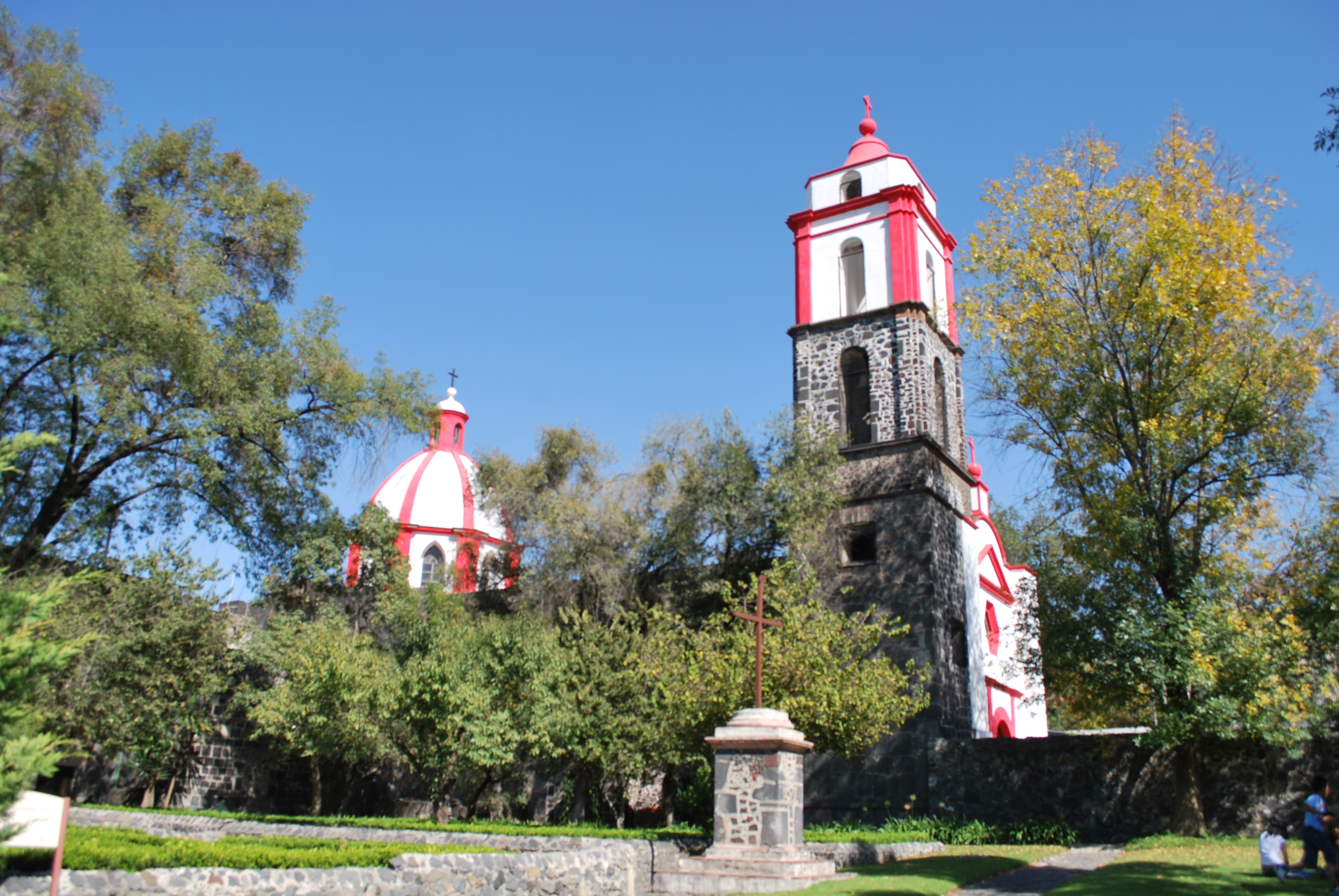
- View of the monastery of Culhuacán
- Interactive map of Pueblo Culhuacán
- Country: Mexico
- City: Mexico City
- Borough: Iztapalapa

Population
  - Total: 3,780
- Postal code: 09800

Pueblo Culhuacán (modern Nahuatl pronunciation) is an officially designated neighborhood of the Iztapalapa borough of Mexico City, which used to be a major pre-Hispanic city. Ancient Culhuacán was founded around 600 CE and the site has been continuously occupied since. The city was conquered by the Aztecs in the 15th century, but the Aztecs considered the city to have status with early rulers marrying into Culhua nobility to legitimize themselves. After the Spanish conquest of the Aztec Empire, the Franciscans and later the Augustinians made Culhuacán a major evangelization center, with the latter building the monastery complex which remains to this day. Today, Culhucan is fully integrated into Mexico City physically and politically. This area was designated as a "Barrio Mágico" by the city in 2011.

== Modern Pueblo Culhuacán ==
Culhuacan is one of the subdivisions of the borough of Iztapalapa, bordering the borough of Coyoacán. Geographically, it is located at the base of the Cerro de la Estrella mountain. Today, the area known as Culhuacan is politically divided into eleven units, called “colonias,” “barrios” or “pueblos” with the historic center designated as Pueblo (village) Culhuacán, due its earlier independent status as an altepetl and then as a recognized pueblo by the Spanish colonial government.

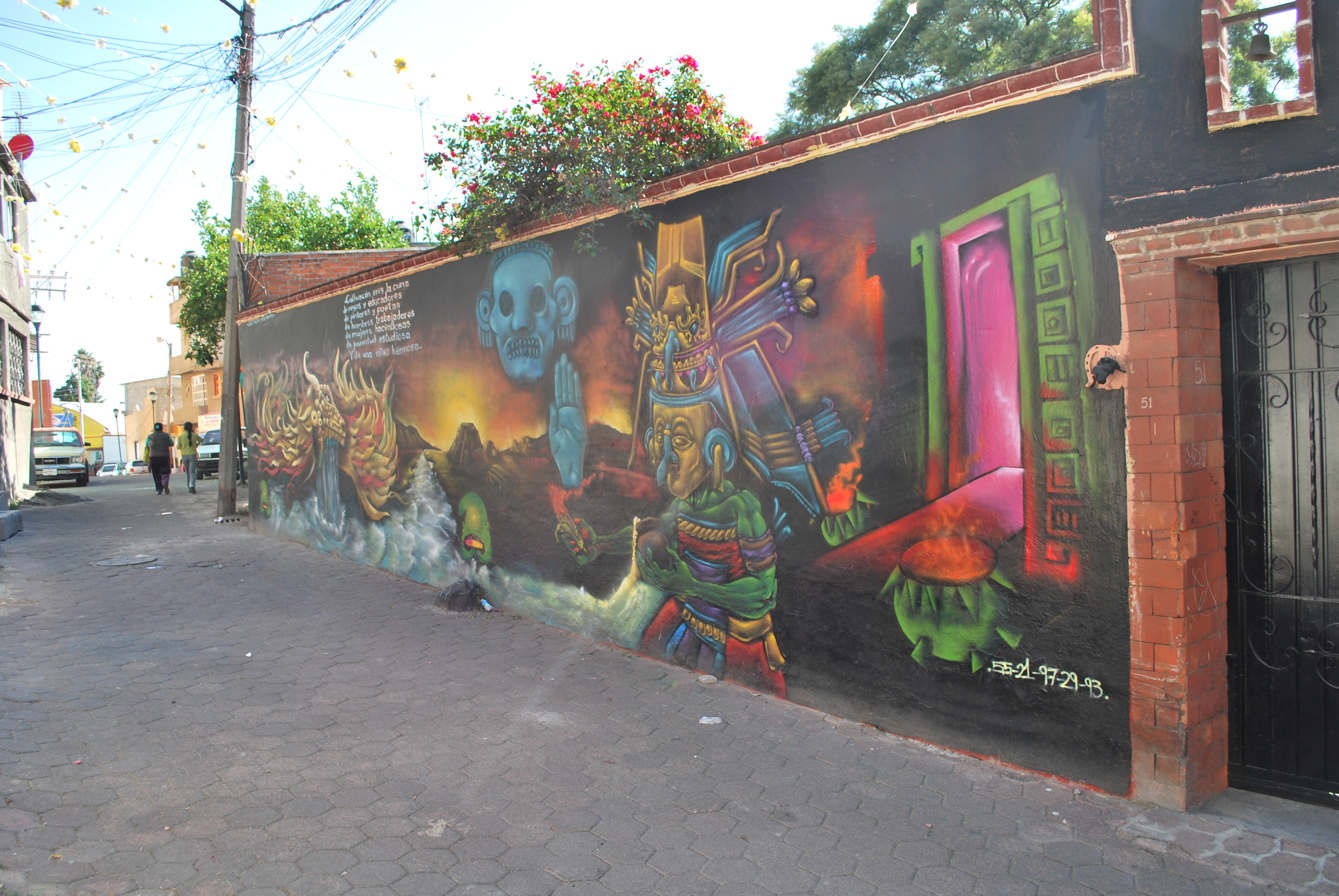
Graffiti mural by Nomadas Colectivo on 16 de Septiembre Street.

The area was separate and rural as late as early 20th century, made up of chinampas separated by a series of canals. The Culhuacan area is now physically, economically and politically integrated into Mexico City, covered in modern cinderblock and cement structures that continue uninterrupted into neighboring areas. Line 12 of the Mexico City Metro passes through the Pueblo with the elevated station Pueblo Culhuacán only a couple of blocks from the central 16th century monastery complex.

What is now Avenida Tláhuac was a canal in the colonial period. This canal was a main waterway connecting Mexico City with the agricultural areas of Chalco and Xochimilco with flat bottomed canoes called trajineras carrying produce to the city. In the mid 20th century, this canal was closed, filled in and paved over to create the current road. Line 12 of the Metro here is elevated following this same road.

To this day, the residents of this area maintain a kind of rivalry with those from the historic center of Iztapalapa on the other side of the Cerro de la Estrella. Both host passion plays during Holy Week and each has a small natural cave that contains an image of the buried Christ as a local pilgrimage site. Culhuacan's cave site is marked by a chapel called the Capilla del Señor del Calvario. It refers to the image what is said to have been found over 200 years ago by quarry workers in this cave.

== The pre-Hispanic City-State (altepetl) ==
The name comes from Nahuatl and means “place of the culhuas.” The term “culhua” means “ancient or venerable” but it can also mean “hunched” which might refer to the Cerro de la Estrella. However, the area was considered by the Mexica to be an ancient religious and mythical place as a connection to the cultural past.

Culhuacan was founded in 600 CE and was a center of influence in the lake area of the Valley of Mexico . The Ramírez Codex says that this city was recognized by the Mexica as a contemporary to the mythical Aztlán and of the ancestors of the peoples who were in the Valley of Mexico before the Aztecs. The early Mexica leaders married women from Culhuacan in order to legitimize their lineage.

Culhuacan's prime was between the fall of Tula and the rise of Tenochtitlan, making it a major power in the Valley of Mexico for three hundred years. Culhuacán was located on the north coast of the Lake Chalco/Lake Xochimilco, which has since dried up. According to archeological studies, the site appears to have been continuously inhabited since its initial founding. Until between 600 and 800 CE, it was an important provincial city under the domination of Teotihuacan. Between 800 and 900 CE, it became governed by a Toltec-Chichimeca dynasty, which dominated much of the south of the Valley of Mexico. Between 900 and 1000 CE, Culhuacan, along with Tula and Otumba, formed the nucleus of the Toltec empire. When this fell, Culhuacan became a haven for the last of the Tula ruling class. The city declined but despite this, it remained the most powerful in the valley until the rise of Tenochtitlan in the 15th century.

However, almost nothing remains of the pre-Hispanic settlement because it was completely destroyed, with the exception of the temple at the Cerro de la Estrella, which then became the center of the Aztec's 52-year renewal ceremony.

== Colonial-era Culhuacan ==
A great deal is known about colonial-era Culhuacan, especially the late sixteenth century. Cullhuacan was the subject of a Relación Geografica, a project by the Spanish crown to systematically gather data on indigenous communities. Many of these reports to the crown had pictorial maps drawn by indigenous scribes accompanying them; Culhuacan's written report and the map have been published. A fragment of the first baptismal register survives. The richest source of Culhuacan's history is a collection of last wills and testaments and other documents in Nahuatl from the period 1580–1600, now found in the collections of the Universidad Iberoamericana. The analysis of the information in the Nahuatl wills has made possible the writing of a social history of the town at a particular period in its colonial history, an example of the New Philology.

== The monastery ==
The monastery of San Juan Evangelista is one of the few remaining from the 16th century in Mexico City. It is located on Avenida 10 between Avenida Taxquena and Avenida Tláhuac. After the Spanish conquest of the Aztec Empire, Culhuacan was selected as an evangelization center first by the Franciscans and then by the Augustinians. The Franciscans founded a small mission over the ruins of the Culhuacan main temple. They were replaced by the Augustinians between 1552 and 1569, who replaced the Franciscan mission with a monastery and church. This monastery was dedicated to the John the Apostle and became the center of learning and religion for the area. The monastery closed as such in 1756, when the Spanish Crown took away much of the power of the religious orders in New Spain. The complex was converted into a parish. Later it became a Catholic school and then a barracks for the Zapatistas. It also served as the offices of the Direction of Historic Monuments of the INAH. Restoration work began in 1944 when it was declared a historic monument, and finished in the 1980s.

The monastery is built in a mostly Renaissance style with walls of basalt obtained locally. The current portico used to lead to the monastery's garden and originally served as an open chapel, then as a portal to receive pilgrims. The wall of this has a series of multicolored frames in Baroque style. In the vestibule a figure of Saint Augustine is featured protecting representatives of various religious orders. Attached to the vestibule is a small chapel for meditation which also conserves some of its painting from the 16th century.

The cloister is square and sober with frescos in Baroque/Plateresque style. It has a garden area in the center and on the four sides there are arches in a somewhat Romance style. Behind these are wide corridors which lead to the kitchen, baths, dining room, refectory, chapter house, library, study areas, the church and confessionals. The upper cloister has twelve cells for monks now occupied by offices and halls of the site museum. This area contains some of the best preserved black and white murals from the 16th century and makes the complex notable. These murals include scenes of Augustinian martyrs and one called the Adoration of the Magi.

Part of the cloister was opened as a museum in 1995, with three halls dedicated to the area's pre-Hispanic history and one to its colonial history. The first hall is called the “Dominion of Culhuacan and the lake area” which contains ceramics such as plates and bowls, mostly of Toltec influence. The other two halls have to do with the history of the city under Mexica domination. During this time, the city was a ceremonial center. Objects on display include cups for pulque, an effigy of the god of death, female figurines, seals, a sacrificial knife, a mask depicting the god Tlaloc and a sculpture of the goddess Chicomecóatl in basalt, which is unique. One section is dedicated to the New Fire ceremony. In addition, there are a number of objects related to everyday life during the pre-Hispanic era, such as farming tools, objects related to textiles and obsidian knives and spear points. Most of the pieces on display are from excavations from the adjoining Parque Histórico and others donated by residents of Culhuacán. The last hall relates to the colonial period, which used to be a private chapel for the use of the monks. The objects here are from the original church, such as the base of the pulpit and four wood columns of an altarpiece from the 16th and 17th centuries. There is also a collection of photographs including those showing the restoration of the complex.

The Culhuacan Community Center is also located in the former monastery. It is a pilot program of the Instituto Nacional de Antropología e Historia dedicated to research, rescue and conservation of local cultural and artistic heritage as well as education. It hosts events such as workshops, concerts, theater, dance and a library, as well as festivals such as the Festival del Son Jarocho and the Feria Latinoamericana del Tamal. It was established in 1984.

== Other landmarks ==
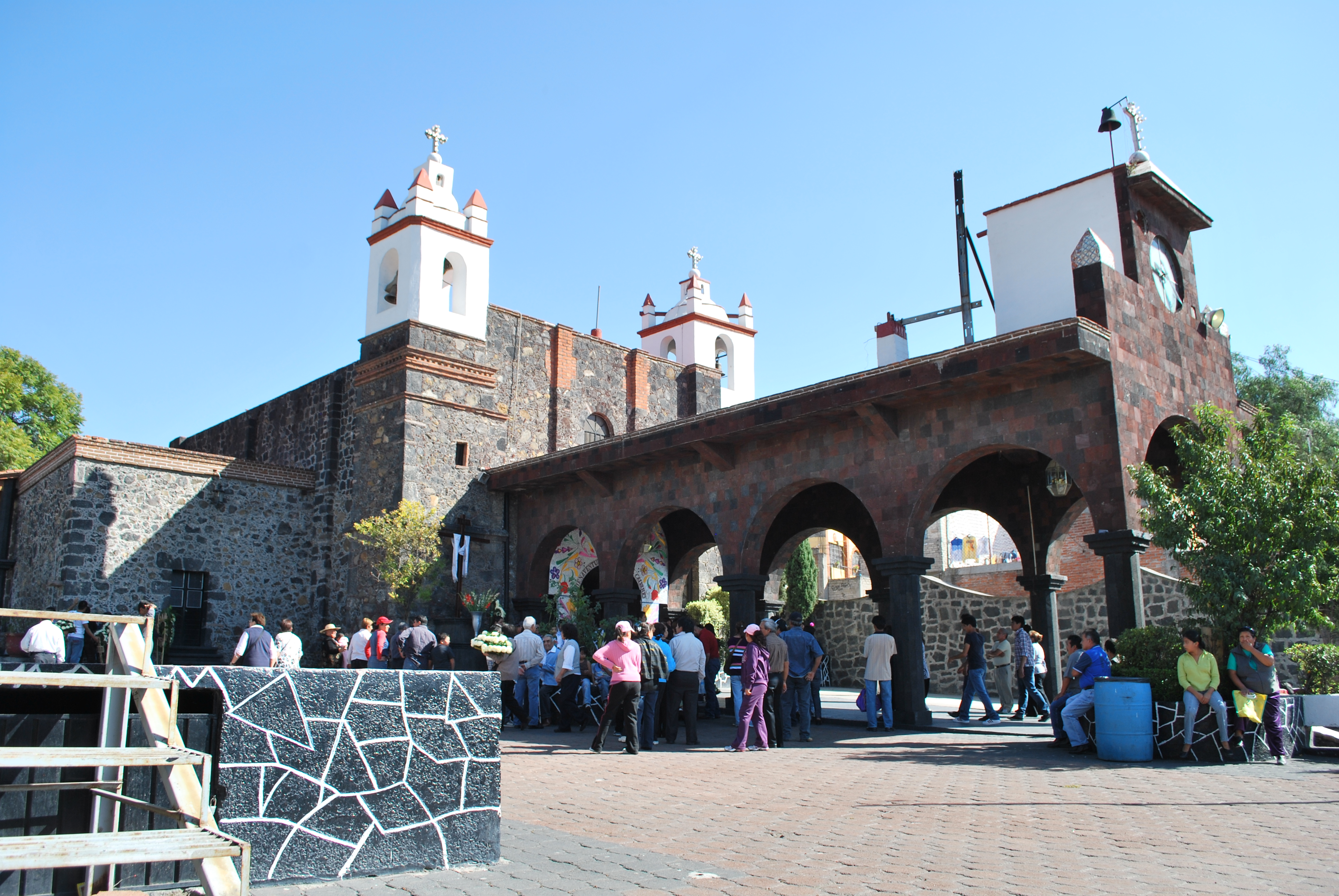
Chapel of the Señor del Calvario

The Parque Historico was established to protect the remaining pre-Hispanic ruins along with a colonial-era dock and reservoir from when this area was part of the chinampa zone on the shoreline of Lake Chalco/Lake Xochimilco and later on the canal connecting it to Mexico City. In the past, this spot was one of the most important for Culhuacán which it is now again today, now as a recreational area. It is part of a reforestation effort in the area by Saul Alcantara Onofre of the INAH and contains native species such as Montezuma cypress and holm oaks .

Culhuacan was home to the first paper mill in New Spain, constructed on what is now Avenida Tláhuac and began functioning in 1580. It was constructed next to a spring, whose water was used to power the millstone. Today, the remains of this mill are in an enclosed plaza. The ruins of the paper mill lay for several centuries without anyone knowing what they were until the mid-20th century. It was used as a garbage dump until the site was investigated by a woman named Teresa Ambriz. However, it was not designated as a historical site until 1987, as part of the monastery complex. The site is flanked by vendors and is hard to see by the casual passer-by.

When the monastery church was closed, another church was built between 1880 and 1897 to the south to replace it. It was also named San Juan Evangelista. This church has a single name with circular windows on the side walls. The cupola has images of various angels and it has the small Plateresque columns on its altar that are on that of the original church.

The Capilla del Señor del Calvario is an important sanctuary in Pueblo Culhuacán as well as Xochimilco and Tlalpan. It contains an image of a buried Christ. This church was built between at the end of the 19th century or early 20th. The interior is small but extended by an appendage added outside and attached to the front facade. The interior is noted for its rich ornamentation with gold leaf on the columns, capitals and areas of the ceiling. The image generally found on the main altar. The church was built next to a small natural cave, which was a shrine in the pre Hispanic period. According to local legend, the image of Christ was found here. In front of this chapel is the Plazuela de la Ancienidad which is dedicated to the memory of the fact that Moctezuma II granted the area to retired soldiers and government servants

== See also ==
Carnivals of Iztapalapa
