= Iztapalapa =

- Borough
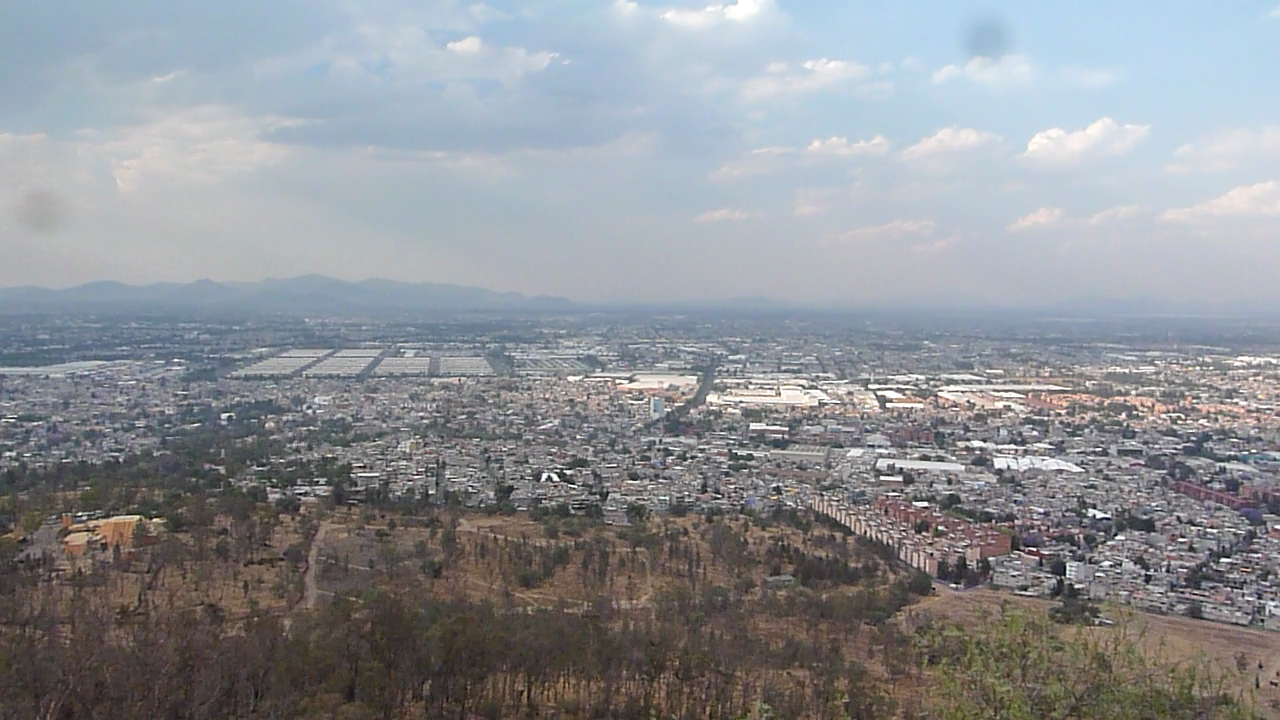
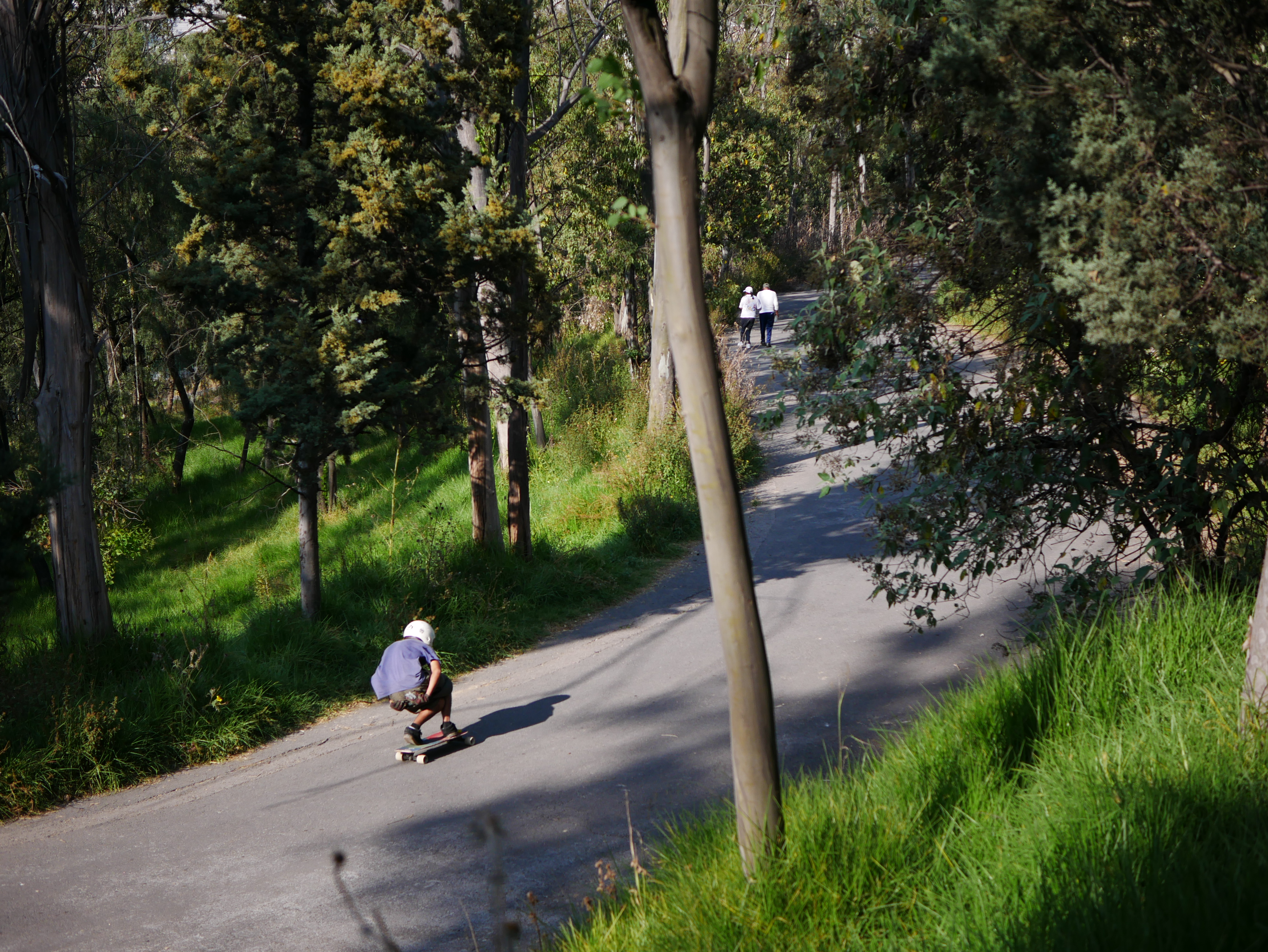
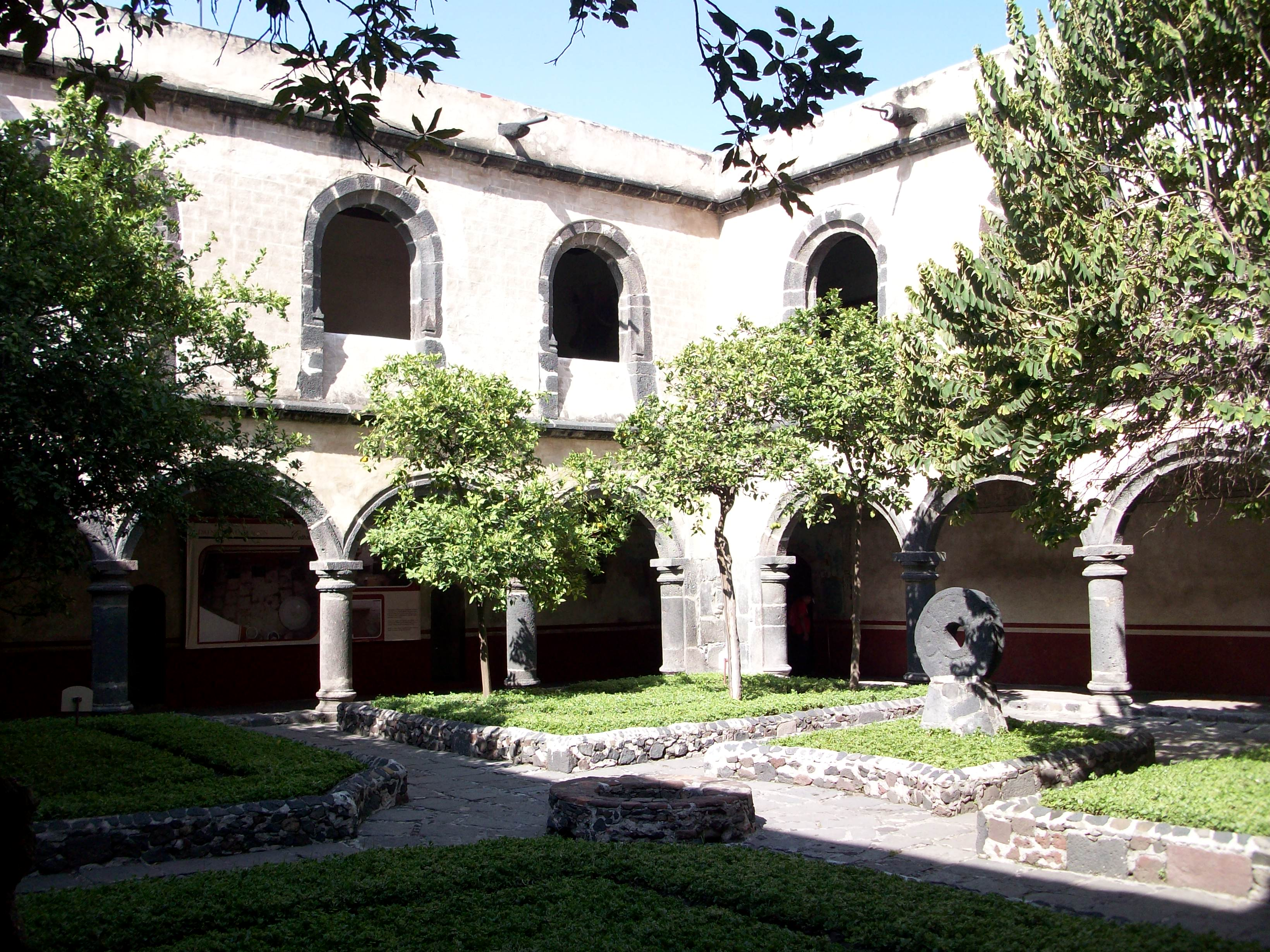
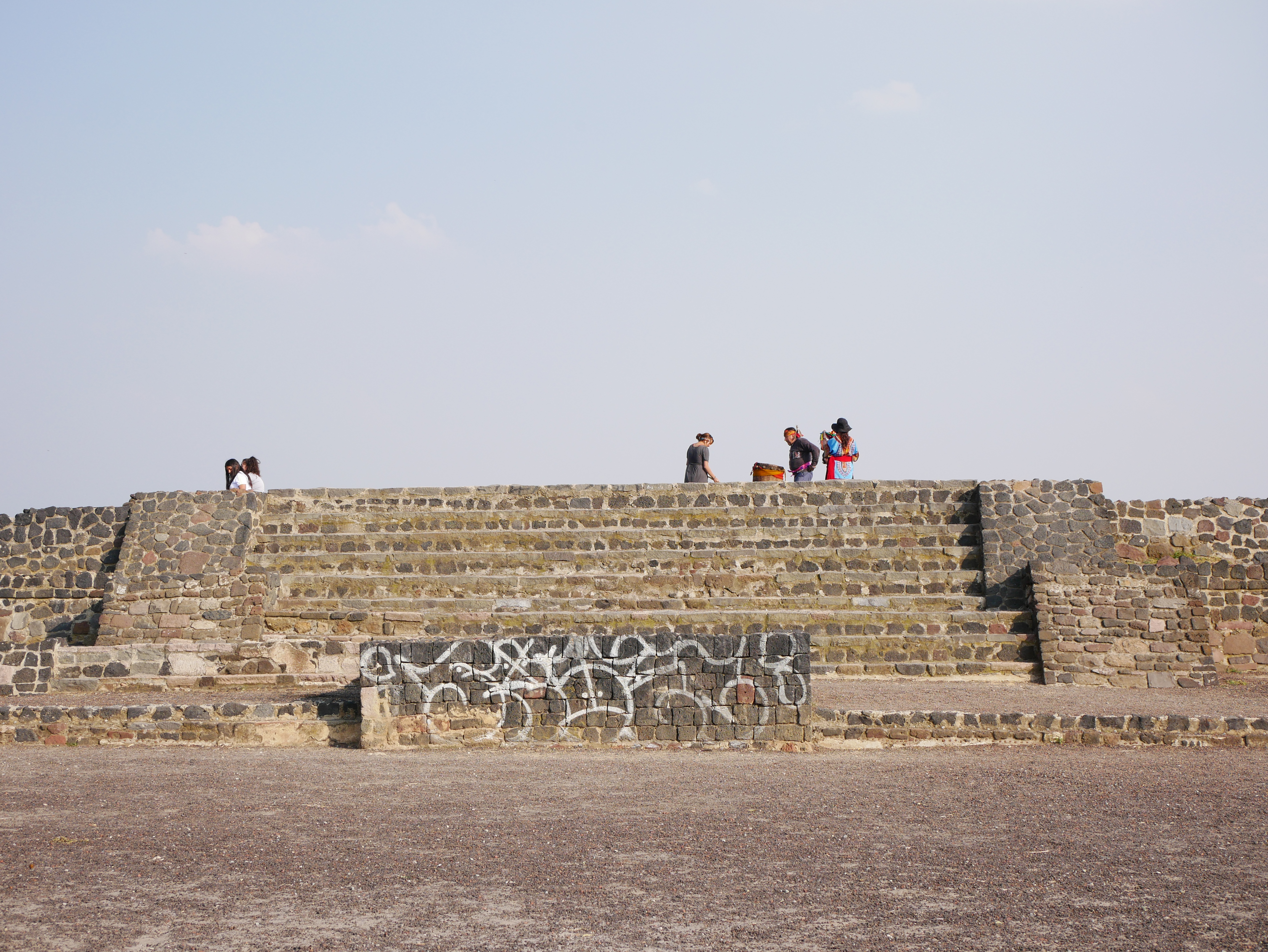
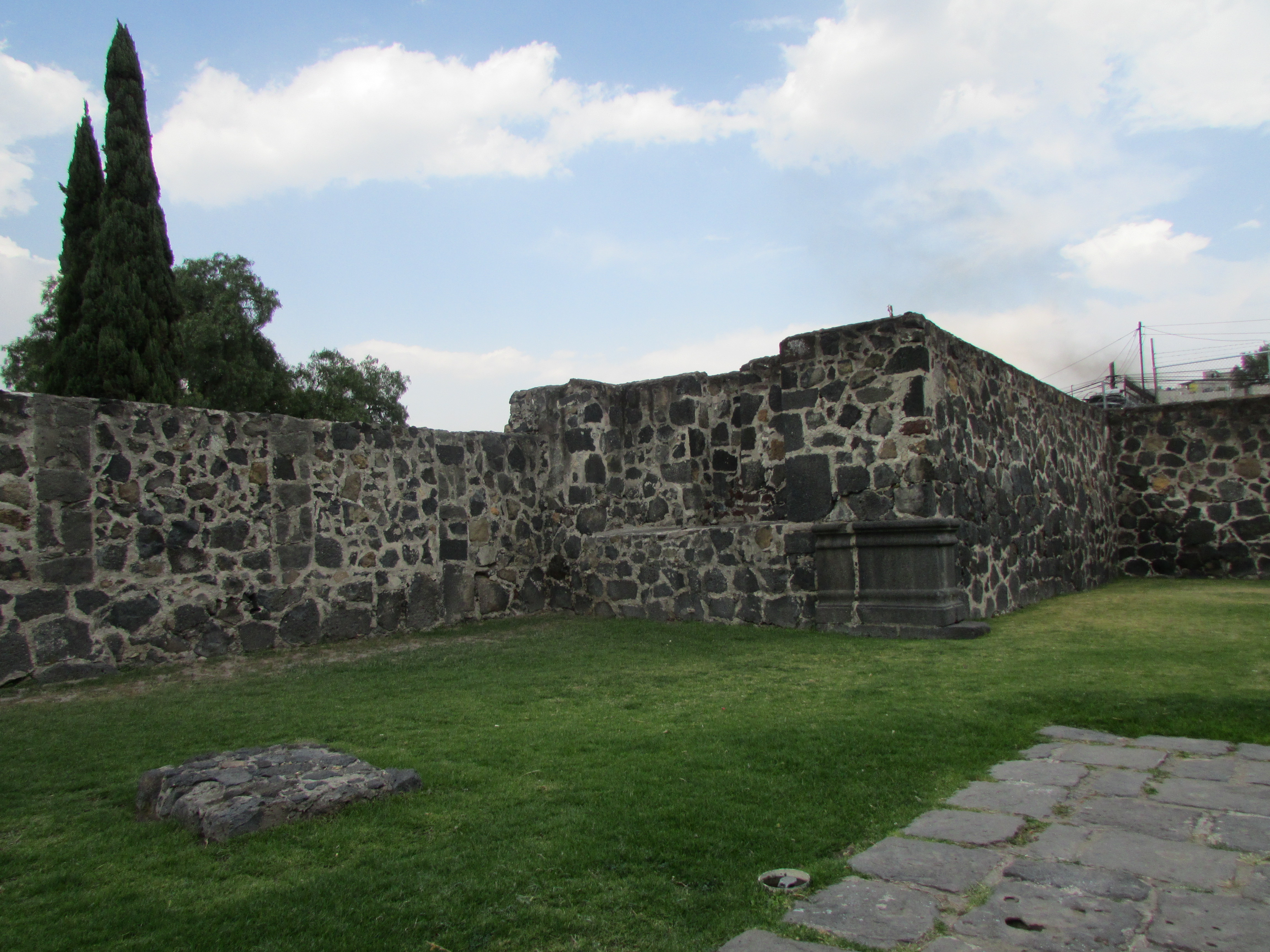
- Top: View of Iztapalapa from Cerro de la Estrella; Middle: Cerro de la Estrella National Park, San Matías Parish and Former Convent; Bottom: Cerro de la Estrella Archaeological Zone, Former Culhuacán Convent

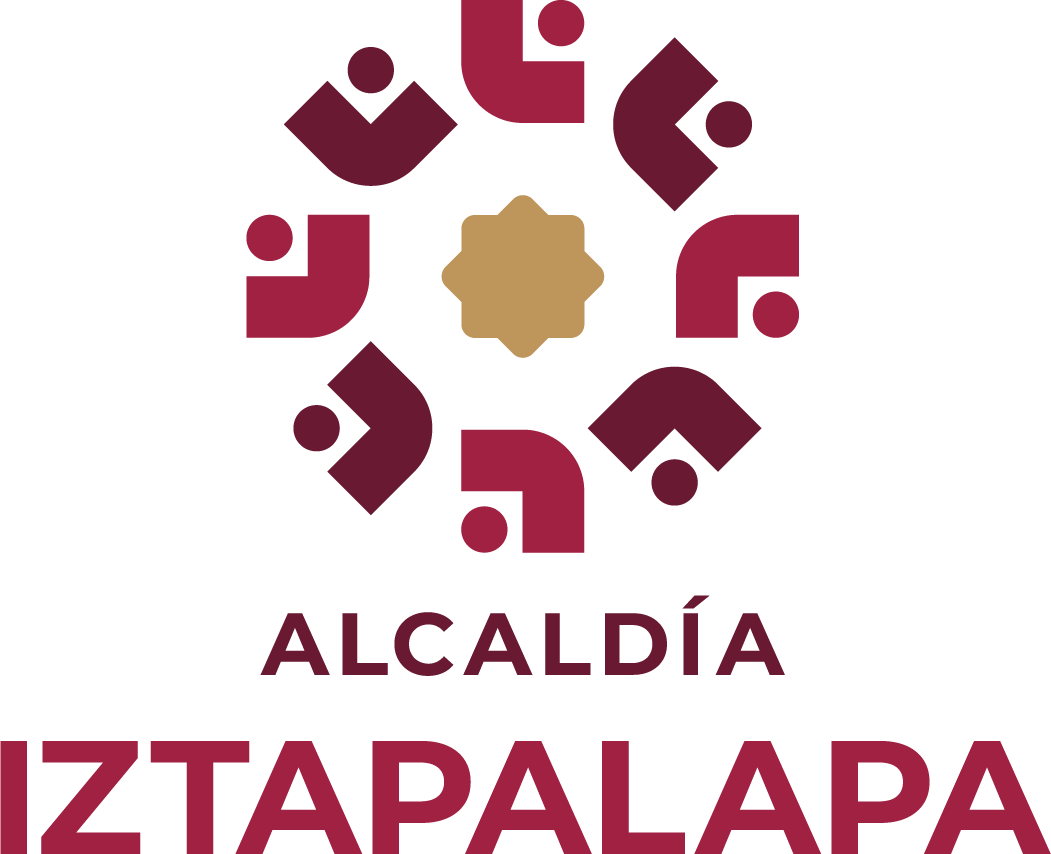
- Seal Logo

- Iztapalapa within Mexico City
- Coordinates: 19°21′30″N 99°05′35″W
- Country: Mexico
- Federal entity: Mexico City
- Established: 1928
- Named for: Ancient Aztec neighborhood
- Seat: Aldama No. 63 esq. Ayuntamiento, Barrio San Lucas, Iztapalapa 09000

Government
  - Mayor: Aleida Alavez Ruiz (MORENA)
  - Federal electoral districts: CDMX-04, CDMX-18, CDMX-19, CDMX-20, CDMX-22

Area
  - Total: 113.76 km^{2} (43.92 sq mi)
- Elevation: 2,240 m (7,350 ft)

Population (2020).
  - Total: 1,835,486
  - Rank: 1st in Mexico City
  - Density: 16,135/km^{2} (41,789/sq mi)
- Time zone: UTC-6 (Zona Centro)
- Postal codes: 09000 – 09990
- Area code: 55
- HDI (2020): ▼0.783 Very High
- Website: iztapalapa.cdmx.gob.mx

Iztapalapa ( modern Nahuatl pronunciation) is a borough (demarcación territorial) in Mexico City located on the eastern side of the city. The borough is named after and centered on the formerly independent municipality of Iztapalapa (officially Iztapalapa de Cuitláhuac). The rest is made up of a number of other communities which are governed by the city of Iztapalapa.

With a population of 1,835,486 as of 2020, Iztapalapa is the most populous borough of Mexico City as well as the second-most populous municipality in the country, after Tijuana. Over 90% of the territory is urbanized, with its green space mostly in parks. Over the past 40 years, Iztapalapa transformed from a rural area primarily dedicated to agriculture to a densely populated borough. This was the result of a large influx of people who settled in the borough from other parts of the country, starting in the 1970s. Most of the population is employed in commerce, services and industry.

Iztapalapa remains afflicted by high levels of economic deprivation, and a significant number of its residents lack access to clean drinking water. Iztapalapa has one of the highest rates of violent crime in Mexico City. Combatting homicides and drug trafficking remain a major issue for local authorities.

The borough is home of one of Mexico City's major cultural events, the annual Passion Play in which 450 borough residents participate and about 2 million attend as spectators.

== Background ==
Today Iztapalapa is a borough of Mexico City, centered on what used to be an independent settlement with its origins in the pre-Hispanic period. It has a territory of 116.67 km^{2} (11,667 ha; 28,830 acres; 45.05 sq mi), and is located on the east side of Mexico City bordering the boroughs of Iztacalco, Xochimilco, Tláhuac, Coyoacán and Benito Juárez. The State of Mexico borders the borough on the east side, and Iztapalapa has strong cultural and economic ties to this part of the state.

The borough was created in 1928, centered on and named after a formerly independent municipality within the then Federal District, which already had governing authority over a number of surrounding communities. The modern borough is made up of 15 “barrios” or neighborhoods, considered to be part of city of Iztapalapa, and 18 other “pueblos” or communities outside of it. To distinguish the original city of Iztapalapa from the rest of the borough, it was officially named Iztapalapa de Cuitláhuac in 2006 in honor of the tenth Aztec emperor. However, eight of the barrios are considered to be the historic center of the city of Iztapalapa, which are La Asunción, San Ignacio, Santa Barbara, San Lucas, San Pablo, San Miguel, San Pedro and San José.

Records of the “eight barrios of Iztapalapa” go back at least until 1898. Borough authorities have sought “Barrios Mágicos Turísticos” (Magical Tourism Neighborhoods) status for these, for a program similar to the “Pueblos Mágicos” tourism program run by the federal government. The goal is to attract visitors to these neighborhoods as well as other landmarks of the borough such as the Cerro de la Estrella, Pueblo Culhuacán, the Churubusco Gardens, La Magdalena Atlazolpa, Los Reyes, San Antonio Culhuacán, Mexicalzingo, the San Lorenzo Cemetery, San Andrés Tetepilco and San José Aculco.

== Elevation and climate ==
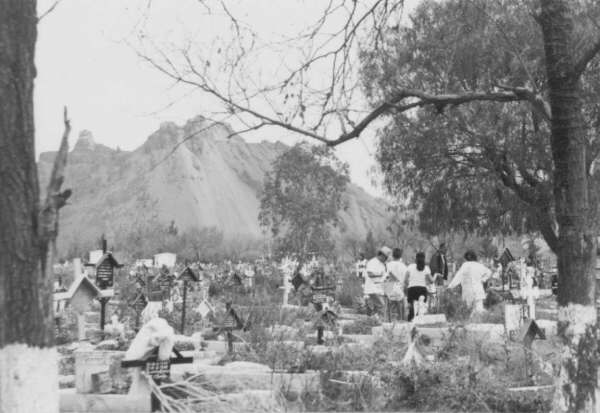
Yohualiuhqui volcano, as seen from the San Lorenzo Tezonco cemetery

The borough has an average elevation of 2,240 m (7,350 ft) asl and extends over firm land and what was former lake bed of Lake Texcoco. Some of the firm land is alluvial plain but most of it are elevations such as the Cerro de la Estrella (2,460 m or 8,070 ft asl), Peñón Viejo or Peñon del Marqués (2,400 m or 7,900 ft asl), and the Sierra de Santa Catalina, which contains the Cerro Tecuatzi (2,640 m or 8,660 ft asl), Cerro Tetecón (2,480 m or 8,140 ft asl), and the Guadalupe Borrego (2,820 m or 9,250 ft asl), Xaltepec (2,500 m or 8,200 ft asl); and Yuhualixqui (2,420 m or 7,940 ft asl) volcanoes. These are recent geological formations, with evidence of lava flow still existent and none extend over 1,000 meters (3,300 ft) above the valley floor. Culturally, the most important of these elevations is the Cerro de la Estrella, which was the site of the New Fire ceremony. Since the pre-Hispanic period, Lake Texcoco has been drained, leaving behind only two natural river called the Churubusco and La Piedad, which unite to form the Unido River, and a few canals. However, the rivers are confined to large pipes as is one of the canals, and most of the Canal Nacional which forms part of the border of the borough has been filled in to create Calzada La Viga road. For this reason, there are no longer any naturally occurring surface water.

The climate of the area is divided into four zones. One consists of a warm wet climate with temperatures above 18 °C (64.4 °F) in the coldest months. Another is a temperate wet climate with temperatures between −3 and 18 °C (26.6 and 64.4 °F) in the coldest months. One has a relatively dry climate with a range of temperatures, and the last consists of a cold climate with average temperature not exceeding 6.5 °C (43.7 °F). Most of the area falls into the temperate category and all receive most of their rainfall in the summer and early fall.

Climate data for Iztapalapa, Mexico City (1951-2010)
Month	Jan	Feb	Mar	Apr	May	Jun	Jul	Aug	Sep	Oct	Nov	Dec	Year
Record high °C (°F)	31.0 (87.8)	31.0 (87.8)	34.5 (94.1)	35.0 (95.0)	34.5 (94.1)	36.0 (96.8)	33.0 (91.4)	32.0 (89.6)	30.0 (86.0)	30.5 (86.9)	29.5 (85.1)	28.0 (82.4)	36.0 (96.8)
Mean daily maximum °C (°F)	23.0 (73.4)	24.7 (76.5)	26.7 (80.1)	27.9 (82.2)	27.9 (82.2)	26.3 (79.3)	24.8 (76.6)	25.0 (77.0)	24.2 (75.6)	24.3 (75.7)	23.9 (75.0)	22.8 (73.0)	25.1 (77.2)
Daily mean °C (°F)	13.3 (55.9)	14.6 (58.3)	16.6 (61.9)	18.3 (64.9)	19.2 (66.6)	19.1 (66.4)	18.2 (64.8)	18.2 (64.8)	17.8 (64.0)	16.8 (62.2)	15.2 (59.4)	13.9 (57.0)	16.8 (62.2)
Mean daily minimum °C (°F)	3.6 (38.5)	4.6 (40.3)	6.5 (43.7)	8.7 (47.7)	10.5 (50.9)	11.9 (53.4)	11.6 (52.9)	11.4 (52.5)	11.5 (52.7)	9.4 (48.9)	6.4 (43.5)	5.0 (41.0)	8.4 (47.1)
Record low °C (°F)	−7.0 (19.4)	−5.0 (23.0)	−2.5 (27.5)	1.0 (33.8)	4.0 (39.2)	2.5 (36.5)	7.0 (44.6)	4.0 (39.2)	1.2 (34.2)	1.0 (33.8)	−3.0 (26.6)	−5.5 (22.1)	−7.0 (19.4)
Average precipitation mm (inches)	11.3 (0.44)	4.7 (0.19)	7.7 (0.30)	23.1 (0.91)	53.3 (2.10)	106.7 (4.20)	123.2 (4.85)	111.9 (4.41)	99.7 (3.93)	51.7 (2.04)	16.7 (0.66)	10.0 (0.39)	620.0 (24.41)
Average precipitation days (≥ 0.1 mm)	1.7	1.7	2.3	5.7	10.1	14.8	18.9	17.4	14.7	8.1	3.3	1.8	100.5
Source: National Meteorological Service

== Urbanization ==
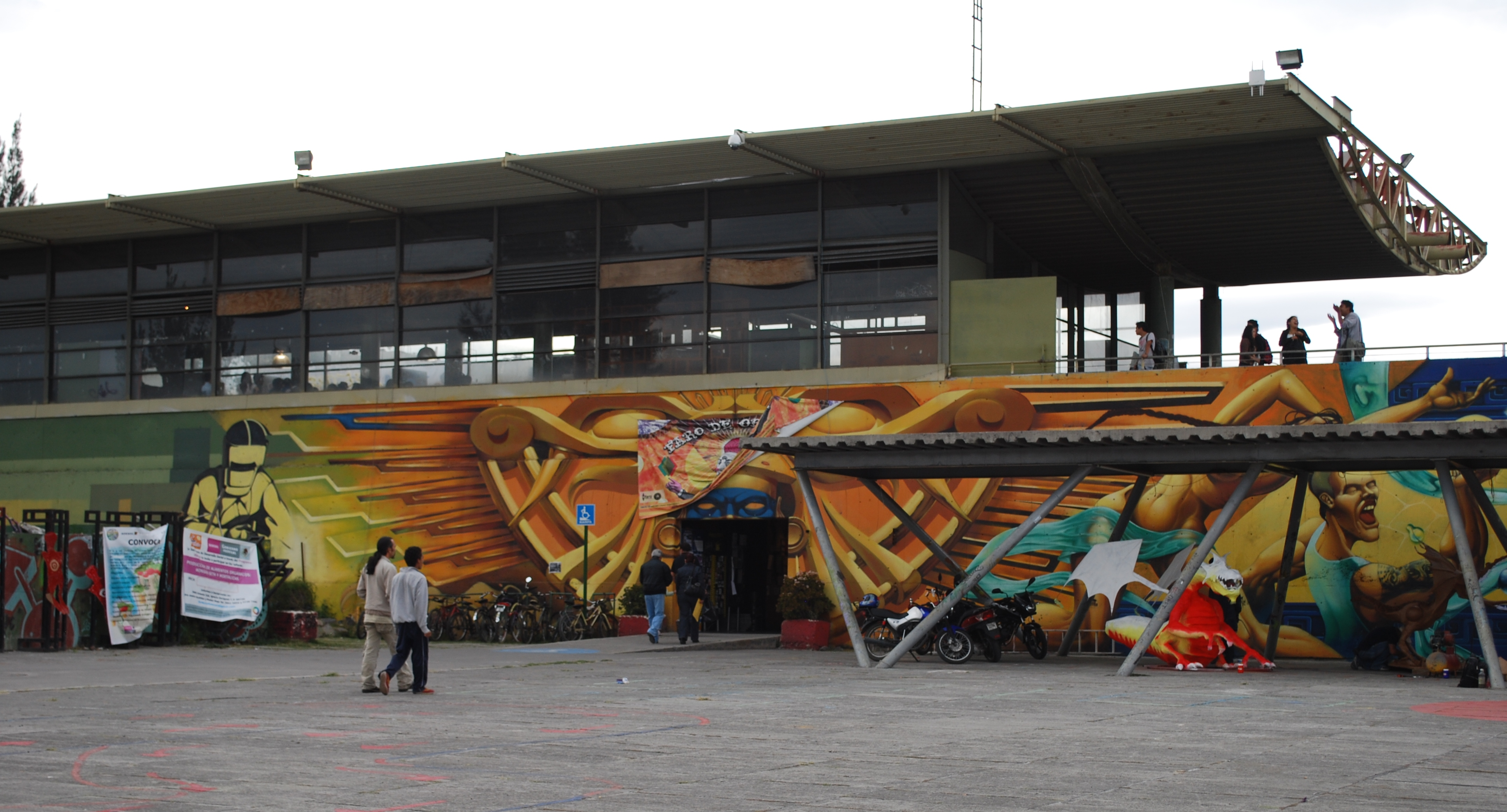
Main building of the Fábrica de Artes y Oficios Oriente

Uncontrolled population growth in the area has nearly wiped out all forms of wildlife in the borough, although as late as the 1960s, there were still a number of waterfowl to be found. Animals found here now are pets or the few cases in which families still raise domestic fowl, rabbits and others for food. Almost all of the borough (90%) is urbanized, with only six percent designated as ecological reserve, concentrated in two parks, the Cerro de la Estrella National Park and the Sierra de Santa Catarina, declared a reserve in 1994. However, both of these areas are under pressure by the continued urbanization and population growth of the area.

Iztapalapa and most of the east side of the Federal District was historically rural and poor up until the mid-20th century. Large-scale urbanization and industrialization began in the 1950s, along with high rates of migration into the borough in the 1970s. Today, it has high population density, limited infrastructure and high levels of socio economic marginalization. Social problems include homelessness, unregulated street vending, illegal building and crimes associated with the sex trade. Many live in rundown housing with deficient municipal services. The exception to this are the areas that border the boroughs of Benito Juárez, Coyoacán and Iztacalco. As of 2010, about 30% of the borough's buildings still have damage from the 1985 earthquake. Most are located in the Peñon Viejo, Ermita Zaragoza, Santa Martha Acatitla, Santa Cruz Meyehualco, El Molino, San Lorenzo and La Hera areas, with about 150,000 damaged homes. Over 95% of the homes in the borough have electricity, running water and sewerage, and the borough provides sufficient educational services and other services such as sports facilities; however, the high population density means that the five or less percent equals a large number of people without sufficient services.

=== Crime ===
Primary problems facing the borough include crime, especially drug trafficking and sale of stolen auto parts, and also lack of water supply. Iztapalpa has the highest rates of rape, violence against women, and domestic violence in Mexico City. Most crime is connected with small scale drug trafficking, which is becoming more frequent on the borough's streets. Between 2008 and 2010, there were 470 murders in the borough, two out of ten for all of Mexico City, with one occurring every two days. It also has one of the highest rates of muggings and robberies of taxi drivers and public buses. Most of the crime problems are concentrated into a group of neighborhoods, such as Santa Martha Acatitla Norte, Desarrollo Urbano Quetzalcoatl, Tenorios, La Polvorilla, Santa Cruz Meyehualco, San Miguel Teotongo, Xalpa, Lomas Estrella, Lonas de Zaragoza and Achualtepec. This area has over 100 known points where drugs are sold. Its proximity to municipalities such as Nezahualcoyotl in the State of Mexico allows criminals to escape jurisdiction easily. However, the borough reports that crime rates diminished 5.41% from 2009 to 2010. Basic services, especially potable water, is lacking in many of these same areas, which are close to the Sierra de Santa Catalina where there is no piped water service; rather it is delivered in trucks to home storage tanks. Sometimes the wait for these trucks can last hours, and there have been hijackings of water delivery trucks. About 96% of homes in the borough do have piped-in water, but about 500,000 residents have insufficient supplies, low pressure and in many places the water quality is visibly poor. Visibly dirty water is locally called “agua de tamarindo” (tamarind water) because of its brown color.

Geographical information of Iztapalapa

Iztapalapa

Climate chart (precipitation, max. and min. temperature)
J	F	M	A	M	J	J	A	S	O	N	D
11 23 4	5 25 5	8 27 7	23 28 9	53 28 11	107 26 12	123 25 12	112 25 11	100 24 12	52 24 9	17 24 6	10 23 5
- █ Average max. and min. temperatures in °C
- █ Precipitation totals in mm
- Source: SMN
Imperial conversion
J	F	M	A	M	J	J	A	S	O	N	D
0.4 73 39	0.2 77 41	0.3 81 45	0.9 82 48	2.1 82 52	4.2 79 54	4.8 77 54	4.4 77 52	3.9 75 54	2 75 48	0.7 75 43	0.4 73 41
- █ Average max. and min. temperatures in °F
- █ Precipitation totals in inches

Weather
Relief and Hidrology

== Landmarks ==
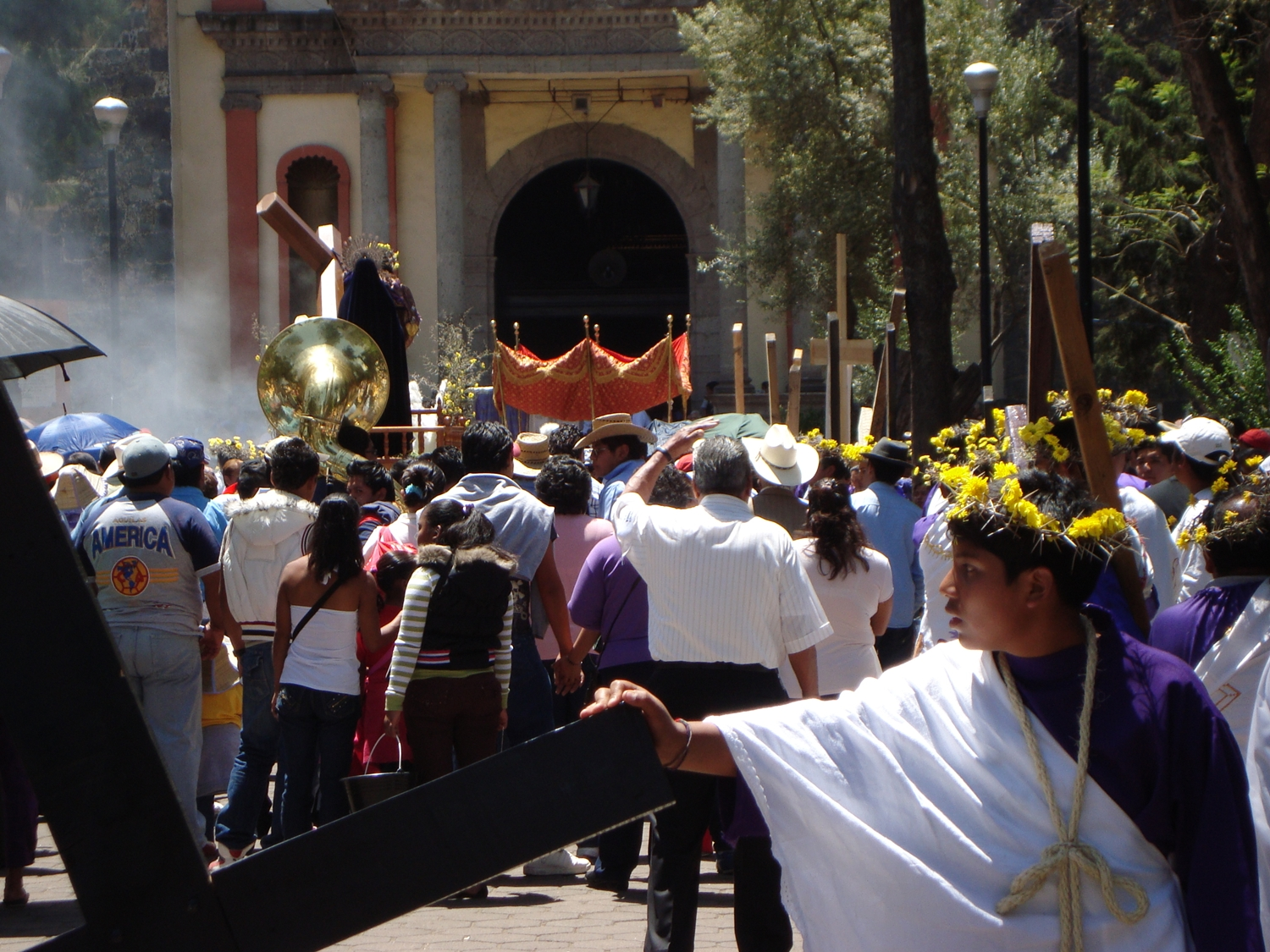
Procession at the Señor de la Cuevita Sanctuary

The borough is home to a number of historic churches, many of which were built in the colonial era. The Franciscans built monasteries and churches in communities such as Huitzilopohco, San Marcos Mexicaltzingo, Santa Marta, and Nativitas Tepetlacingo. Most of these churches, especially those of San Lucas Evangelista, San Marcos Mexicaltzingo, San Juan Evangelista and the chapels of Calvario and Santa Martha Acatitla were built over foundations of pre Hispanic temples, which had been destroyed in the Conquest. The main parish church building of the city of Iztapalapa dates from at least 1664. Its main entrance contains various indigenous symbols. Some churches, however, were built later, such as the Asunción de María parish church built in 1890, and the current San Juan Evangelista church built between 1880 and 1897.

The two most important religious establishments have been Señor de la Cuevita Sanctuary and the former monastery of Culhuacán. The Señor de la Cuevita Sanctuary is located on Avenida Morelos and 16 de Septiembre in the city of Iztapalapa. It was built to house an image of Christ made of cornstalks which is called the “Señor de la Cuevita” (Lord of the Small Cave). According to legend, this image was taken from here to Etla, Oaxaca, but it mysteriously disappeared from there to reappear in a small cave back in Iztapalapa. However, its importance stems from a miracle attributed to it. In 1833, the area was hit by the 1826–1837 cholera pandemic. People appealed to this image and when the plague dissipated, this image was given credit. Yearly rites of gratitude to this image eventually developed into the borough's annual Passion Play. Since 1853, this church has been the center of most indigenous dance held. This is because in that year the archbishop of Mexico forbade “pagan” dances and to avoid confrontation, the dances began to be held here in the main atrium. In 1875, the church was painted by Anacleto Escutia.

The most important monastery founded in the area in the colonial period was in Culhuacán by the Augustinians. This monastery was begun in 1552 and dedicated to John the Baptist. The Augustinians founded a school to teach indigenous languages which operated for over 100 years. It was also a center of paper making, taking advantage of springs and canals for water. The original church of the monastery was demolished a long time ago, but parts of the original complex still remain. The original church was replaced in the late 19th century by the San Juan Evangelista parish church, built between 1880 and 1897. The rest of the complex has been secularized since the 19th century and declared a national monument in 1944. From 1960 to 1984, it was occupied by INAH, which renovated it. Today, this complex is home to the Museo del Exconvento de Culhuacán (Museum of the Former Monastery of Culhuacán), inaugurated in 1987. The grounds around it are referred to as the Parque Historico y Centro comunitario Culhuacán (Culhuacán Historic Park and Community Center). The park contains an artificial pond and areas planted with native trees such as ahuejotes. The monastery complex itself still contains a number of frescos on its walls, and its library is still an important cultural and research center. A number of the old monks’ cells now contain exhibits related to the institution.

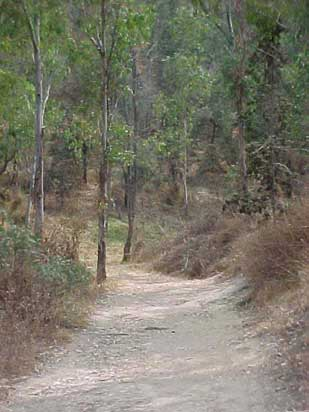
Path on the Cerro de la Estrella

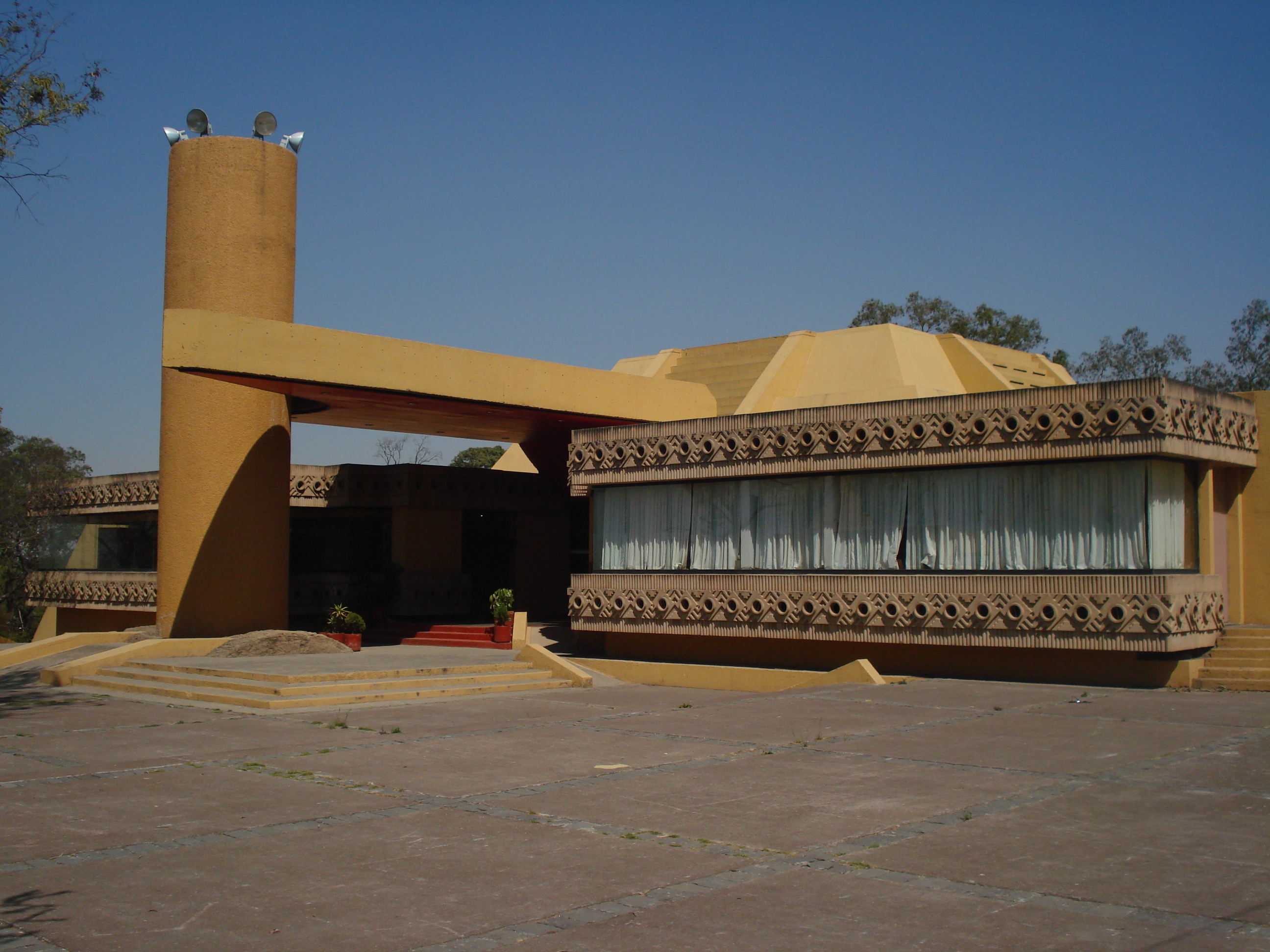
Museo Nuevo Fuego

The Cerro de la Estrella National Park was established in 1938 and is considered to be the most important natural area in the eastern part of the Valley of Mexico. The park covers over 1,093 hectares (2,700 acres) and was established for recreational and cultural purposes. The hill (cerro) was the site of the Aztec New Fire ceremony, last performed in 1507. The park is also culturally important due to the annual Passion Play which is partially conducted on the summit of the cerro each year. The area is managed by the Secretaría de Agricultura y Recursos Hidráulicos, but it lost its original forest cover due to over-cutting of trees. The ecosystem now on the site consists only of planted eucalyptus and Pinus patula trees, along with insects and rodents. There are also problems with illegal building and farming in areas.

The Museo Fuego Nuevo (New Fire Museum) was built by architect David Peña and inaugurated in 1998. The museum is dedicated to the history of the site, especially as related by the Fuego Nuevo Codex. There is evidence of the hill's ritual use going back 4,000 years; however, the New Fire Ceremony was Aztec. Every 52 years ended one cycle and began another. The worry, however, was that the sun would not return and the ceremony was designed to ensure the sun's return in the morning. Excavation of this site and others in the borough was begun in 1974 by INAH. This work has also uncovered fossilized human and mammoth remains in neighborhoods such as Santa María Aztahuacán and Santa Marta Acatitlán.

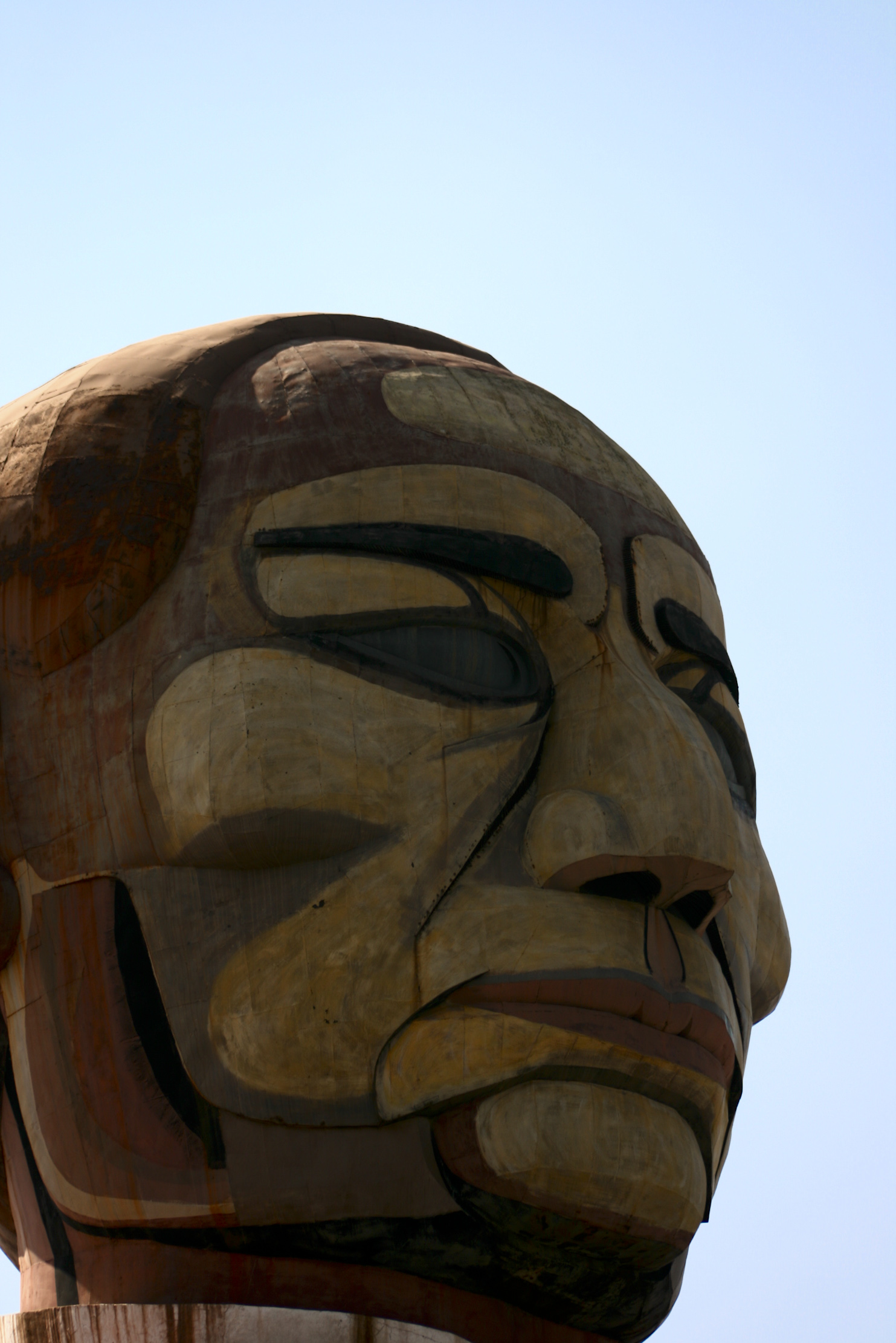
The Cabeza de Juárez museum and monument

The Museo Cabeza de Juárez was constructed in 1976. This museum in Colonia Agua Prieta is an enormous multicolored monument of Benito Juárez’s head that measures 13 metres (43 ft) in height and weighs six tons. It was decorated by David Alfaro Siqueiros but he died before he could finish the work. His brother-in-law, Luis Arenal Bastar completed it. The work is considered to be a fusion of painting, sculpting, engineering and architecture. Today, it contains a number of abstract murals, a permanent collection of lithographs and a large auditorium. The monument is a symbol of the eastern part of the city.

The Central de Abasto (Groceries Center) is Mexico City's main wholesale market for produce and other foodstuffs. It was constructed to be the meeting point for producers, wholesalers, retailers and consumers for the entire country. The site accommodates more than 250,000 people each day and provides foodstuffs for most of the people of Mexico City area. The facility extends over 328 hectares (810 acres) and is the most important commercial center for the city. It is the largest such market in Latin America. It was established in the 1970s, over what were the remaining chinampa farming plots in the borough, effectively eliminating this tradition in this part of the city. The main building was inaugurated in 1982, built by Abraham Zabludovsky, as a slightly deformed hexagon measuring 2.25 metres (7 ft 5 in) across. It was built to take over from the La Merced Market, which was no longer large enough to meet the city's needs for the wholesale distribution of produce and other foodstuffs.

The borough is also home to Mexico City and Mexico's largest fish market, called La Nueva Viga, in Colonia San José Aculco on Prologación Eje 6 Sur. With 202 wholesalers and 165 retail outlets, it distributes about 60% of the country's seafood production along with much of what is imported. The market begins business at 4:00 a.m., when delivery trucks bring in fresh fish from all over Mexico to the vendors. This daily delivery is about 500 tons and includes all kinds of seafood from shrimp to fish to shellfish to small sharks and manta rays. The main fish market is here due to Mexico City's role as economic center since the pre Hispanic period.

The twice-weekly El Salado tianguis or street market offers everything from the cheapest used items to luxury items can be found.

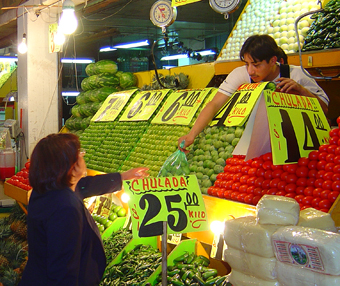
Scene inside the Central de Abastos

The Fábrica de Artes y Oficios Oriente was inaugurated in 2000, located between the two largest apartment complexes of the borough, the Iztapalapa and the Unidad Vicente Guerrero. It contains a forum for 800 people, lobby with two wings for expositions and workshops. Classes are given in guitar, dance, candlemaking, ceramics, and sewing. There is also an area for major event which can hold 1,500 people.

The community museum of San Miguel Teotongo on the highway to Puebla contains finds related to the ancient inhabitants of the area. Most relate to the pre-Hispanic period and include utensils, ceremonial objects, ceramics, obsidian blades and arrowheads and jewelry.

The Museo de Hidrobiologia (Hydrobiology Museum) mostly contains preserved example of the various species found in the different types of water found in Mexico. These include rivers, lakes, ponds, estuaries, beach areas as well as reefs offshore.

The current borough government building, or palacio delegacional, was inaugurated in 1989. It contains a mural by Francisco Cárdenas done in 2003 called “Iztapalapa: Ayer, Hoy y Siempre” (Iztapalapa: Yesterday, Today and Always).

The borough contains two large penal institutions called the Centro de Ejecución de Sanciones Penales Varonil Oriente and the Centro de Readaptación Social Varonil Santa Martha Acatitla. The Centro de Ejecución de Sanciones Penales Varonil Oriente (Center for the Execution of Penal Sanctions for Men East), more commonly called the Reclusorio Oriente (East Prison) was inaugurated in 1987 for adult males. The building extends over a 10,400 square metres (112,000 sq ft) surface in colonial San Lorenzo Tezonco. It contains five dormitories, intake center, workshops, sports facilities and classrooms. The Centro de Readaptación Social Varonil Santa Martha Acatitla (Center for Male Social Readaptation Santa Martha Acatitla) is for juvenile males which was inaugurated in 2003. It has a maximum population of 672 housed in four buildings with basketball court, dining hall, workshops, classrooms and computer room. A new building is under construction to bring the capacity up to 900 inmates.

== Transportation ==
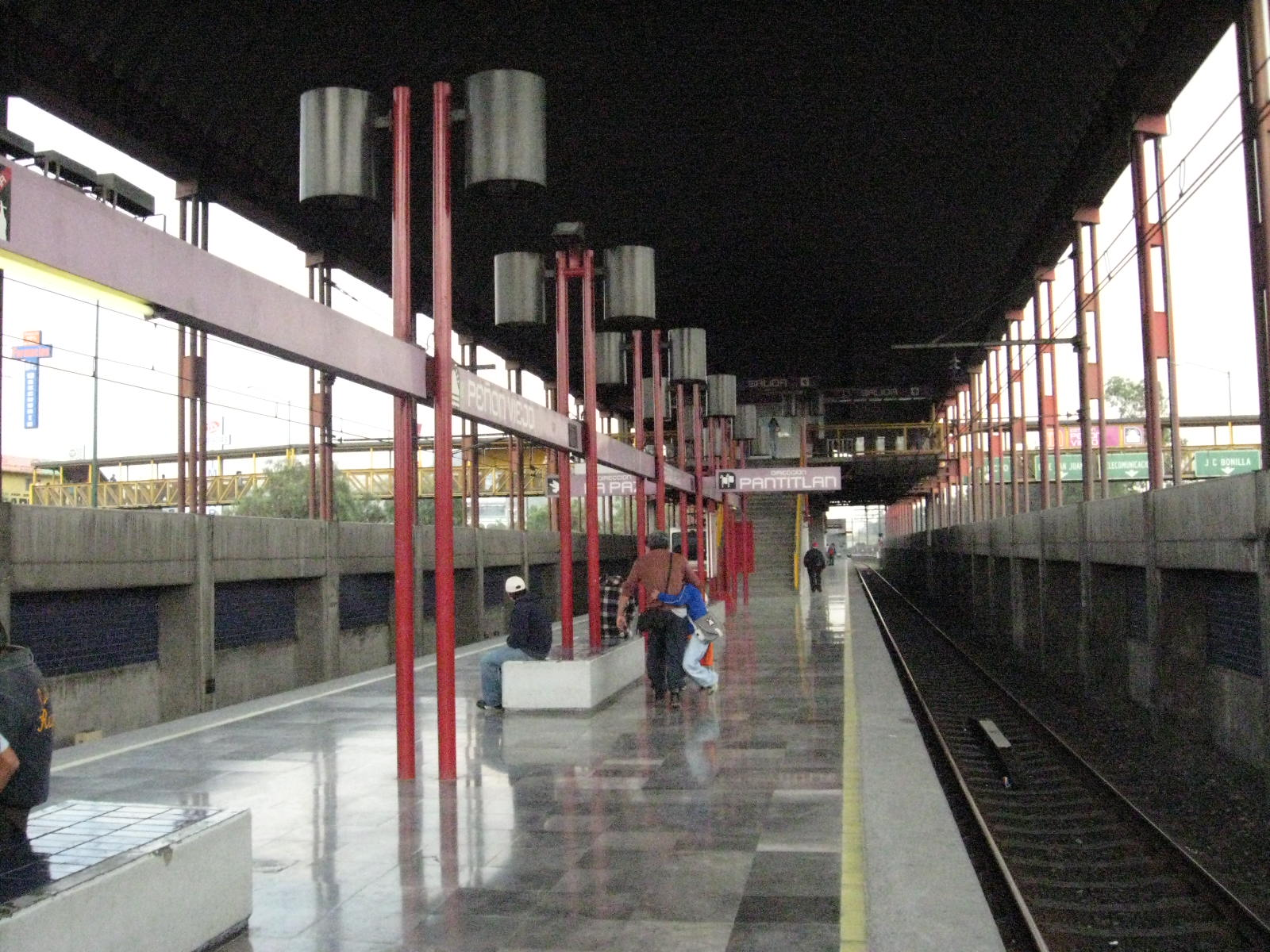
Metro Peñón Viejo

For most of the borough's history, most transportation of people and freight was done on the waters of the lake and through canals. However, these began to dry up starting in the 19th century. They remained important up until the early 20th century, with even steamships passing through at one time. In the 1930s, many of the barrios of Iztapalapa were still marked by canals and still grew vegetables, fruits and flowers. Eventually, major traffic was confined mostly to the Canal Nacional. As the canals dried up, newer modes of transportation were introduced. In 1903, mule-drawn trolleys were introduced into the municipality to link it Mexico City via Jamaica. These trolleys would be used to bring Mexican president Francisco I. Madero to celebrate his inauguration in 1912. Several train lines linked the area to other parts of Mexico by 1922. The first bus services between the center of Mexico City and the large market was begun in 1952.

Today, most transportation in the borough is on various roadways via public or private vehicle. Main avenues include Calzada Ermita-Iztapalapa, Calzada Ignacio Zaragoza, Calzada Benito Juárez, Calzada La Viga, Anillo Periférico Norte, Circuito Interior, Avenida Tláhuac, Avenida Plutarco Elias Calles. The “Eje” road system in the area includes Eje 3 Sur, Eje 4 Sur, Eje 5 Sur, Eje 6 Sur, Eje7 Sur, Eje 8 Sur, Eje 2 Oriente, Eje 3 Oriente, Eje 4 Oriente and Eje 5 Oriente. The main highway leaving Mexico City towards Puebla cuts through the borough. Each day about 80,000 vehicles pass through, making it the second busiest highway section in Mexico City. Many of these are local and intercity buses which can block two out of the three lanes. Construction work has been done to widen the highway, but political disputes have kept new lanes from opening as of early 2011. Public transportation includes several trolleybus lines, busses, taxis and bicitaxis. Line 8 and Line A of the Metro also pass through the borough.

Metro stations

- Apatlaco
- Aculco
- Escuadrón 201
- Atlalilco
- Iztapalapa
- Cerro de la Estrella
- UAM-I
- Constitución de 1917
- Tepalcates
- Guelatao
- Peñón Viejo
- Acatitla
- Santa Marta
- Mexicaltzingo
- Culhuacán
- San Andrés Tomatlán
- Lomas Estrella
- Calle 11

In August 2021, Iztapalapa opened the Cablebús Line 2, a cable car system thats runs through the borough, and goes above the Sierra de Santa Catarina volcanoes and Iztapalapa homes that have painted murals on the roofs. The cable car system is 10.6 kilometers, making it one of the largest cable car networks in all of Latin America.

== Demographics ==
With a population of 1,815,768 as of the 2010 census, Iztapalapa is the most populous and fastest growing borough in Mexico City. It is also the most populous locality (localidad) in Mexico, larger than Ecatepec de Morelos or Guadalajara. Until the mid-20th century, the area was rural, but migration into the borough began in the 1970s as this is the only area with significant land that could be developed. From 1970 to 1980, it accounted for 54.3% of the city's population increase. From 1980 to 1990, Iztapalapa gained 341,988, more than 1.6 times that of the rest of the city. Most of the migration came from families leaving the center of the city, but more importantly many migrants from other parts of Mexico into the city settled in the relatively cheap Iztapalapa. In the last decades, the population increase of the borough has accounted for 83% of the population growth of Mexico City. Today, the population of the borough accounts for over 20.5% of Federal District’s total. The population growth has slowed somewhat, but at its peak in the 1990s, it was over 100%. This population growth has spurred the location of most of the city's housing projects of the last decades in this area. The borough's population is still expected to increase at a rate of 0.77%. While migration into the borough is significant, there is very little migration out into other parts of Mexico or abroad.

Most of the borough's residents are poor to middle class, with a very large percentage of youth. Just over 42% of the population is considered to be socioeconomically marginalized, meaning there are fully or partially excluded from social and/or municipal services of one type or another. While this is not the highest level of all the boroughs, since Iztapalapa has the highest population by a significant margin, most of the city's marginalized are here with just under 9% of Mexico City's total. The population between 0 and 19 years of age represents about 40% of the total. Next are those between 20 and 34, who account for about 29% of the total. A large percentage of the population of the borough is under 15 at 36.4%, with only 7.6% over 50.

=== Languages ===
During the colonial period into the 19th century, Iztapalapa was mostly indigenous, with small population of European descent and mestizos. Migration into the area eventually would change the ethnic composition to primarily mestizo and the Nahuatl language would essentially disappear. As of 2005, only about two percent of the population speaks an indigenous language, with 94.8% bilingual in Spanish as well. This is about equal to the city average. However, the borough contains about 25% of the total ethnic indigenous of the city. Most of the indigenous languages found in the borough are those associated with the state of Oaxaca, such as Zapotec, Mixteca and Chatina. Oaxacan languages account for 34.9% of the total. Uto-Aztecan languages account for 23.32% which include Tarahumara, Mayo, Yaqui, Cora and Huichol. Another significant percentage are those of the Oto-Pamean languages which include Otomi, Mazahua and Matlatzinca. The only language which has been spoken in Mexico not represented in Iztapalapa is Kickapoo.

=== Religion ===
The overwhelming majority of the population is Catholic, although this has declined by 1.9% since the 1990s. Protestant and Evangelical sects have grown to about 6% of the population, with less than 2% professing no faith.

=== Education ===
The first public primary school classes in Iztapalapa were established in 1914 under the government of Venustiano Carranza at Escuela Enrique Laubscher and in the San Lucas Church. However, during the government of Lázaro Cárdenas, many in the borough refused to send their children to school, afraid that they would be indoctrinated against the Catholic faith. Today, the borough has sufficient educational infrastructure, with most schools belonging to the primary level. There are a number of institutions of higher education such as UAM, and the Facultad de Estudios Superiores Zaragoza of UNAM. There are 452 preschools, 612 primary schools, 191 middle schools, 21 vocational schools, 35 high schools, and two teachers’ colleges. Ninety-five percent of children between five and nine years of age attend school, with 96% of those between 10 and 14. Only 62% of those between 15 and 19 attend school and 27% of those between 20 and 24. About 4% of the population above the age of six is illiterate with 63% of this number being female. The highest rates of illiteracy are in the 65 and older age group.

Public high schools of the Instituto de Educación Media Superior del Distrito Federal (IEMS) include:

- Escuela Preparatoria Iztapalapa I
- Escuela Preparatoria Iztapalapa II "Benito Juárez"
- Escuela Preparatoria Iztapalapa III "Miravalles"
- Escuela Preparatoria Iztapalapa IV

The Universidad Autónoma Metropolitana was established in 1974 with three campuses in Azcapotzalco, Xochimilco and Iztapalapa. Iztapalapa was constructed first and covers an area of 177,966 square metres (1,915,610 sq ft). Most of the institution's research work is conducted at the Iztapalapa campus. Other institutions include the University Autónoma dela Ciudad de México, San Lorenzo Campus and the Instituto Tecnológico de Iztapalapa.

== Economy ==
The two most important economic activities in the borough are manufacturing and commerce. Sixty-three percent of all business establishments are dedicated to commerce, which employ 42% of the people and accounts for 45% of the borough's GDP. Commerce and services together employ 63.3% of the population. Twenty-four percent of this commerce is wholesale, much of which is tied to the Central de Abasto and the La Nueva Viga markets. However, wholesale businesses have declined 2.8% while retail establishment have increased 8.1%. This has a positive effect on employment, but this activity adds less to the GDP. The largest sector of retail sales is in street markets called tianguis, followed by public markets, street peddlers and lastly through the Central de Abasto.

A total of 32.5% is employed in industry, minerals and construction. Industry includes food processing, bottling, tobacco products, metals, machinery, surgical equipment, paper and printing and textiles. Only 0.3% is now employed in agriculture or livestock.

== Culture ==
=== Passion Play ===
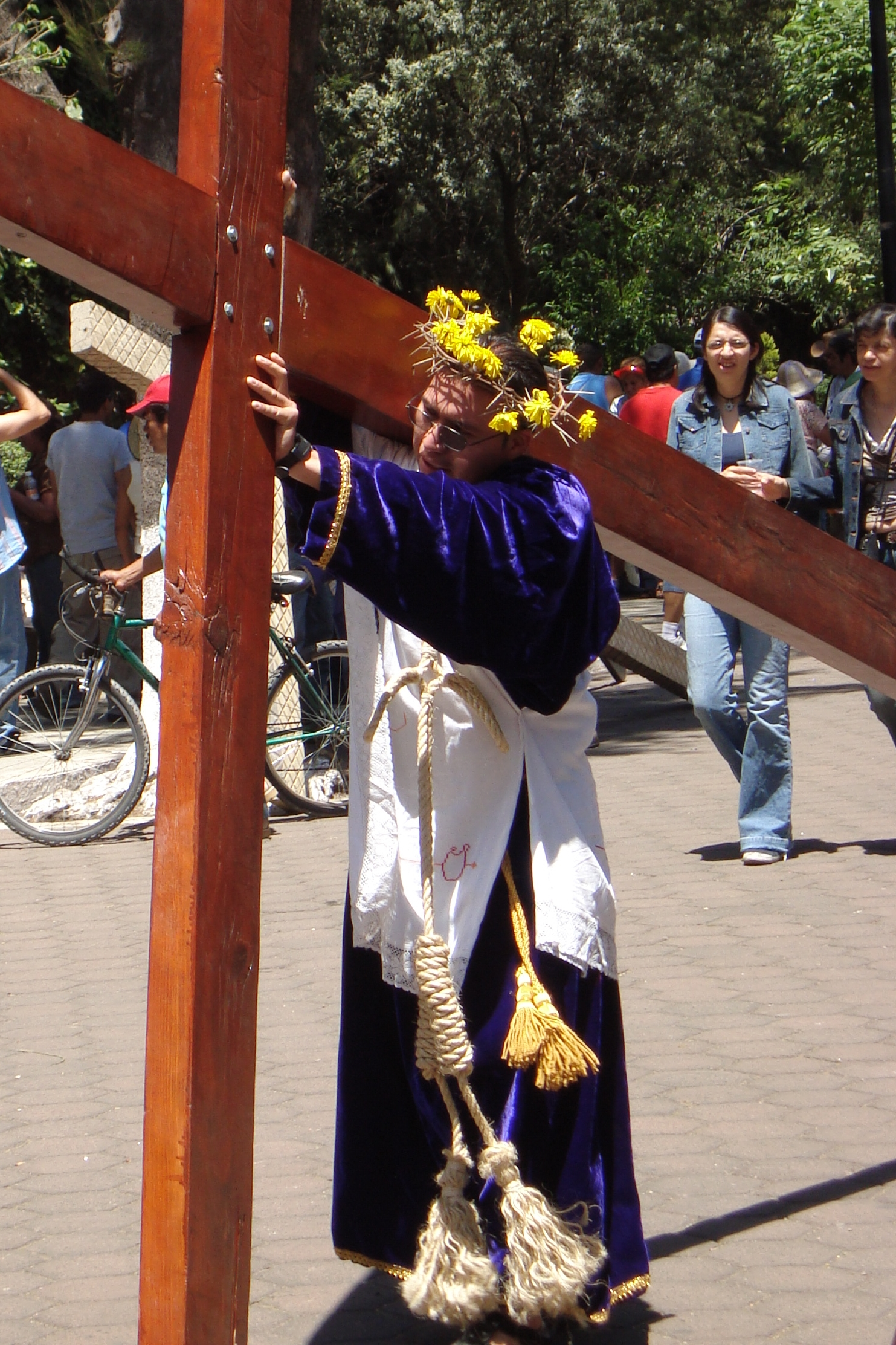
Man carrying cross during Holy Week in Iztapalapa

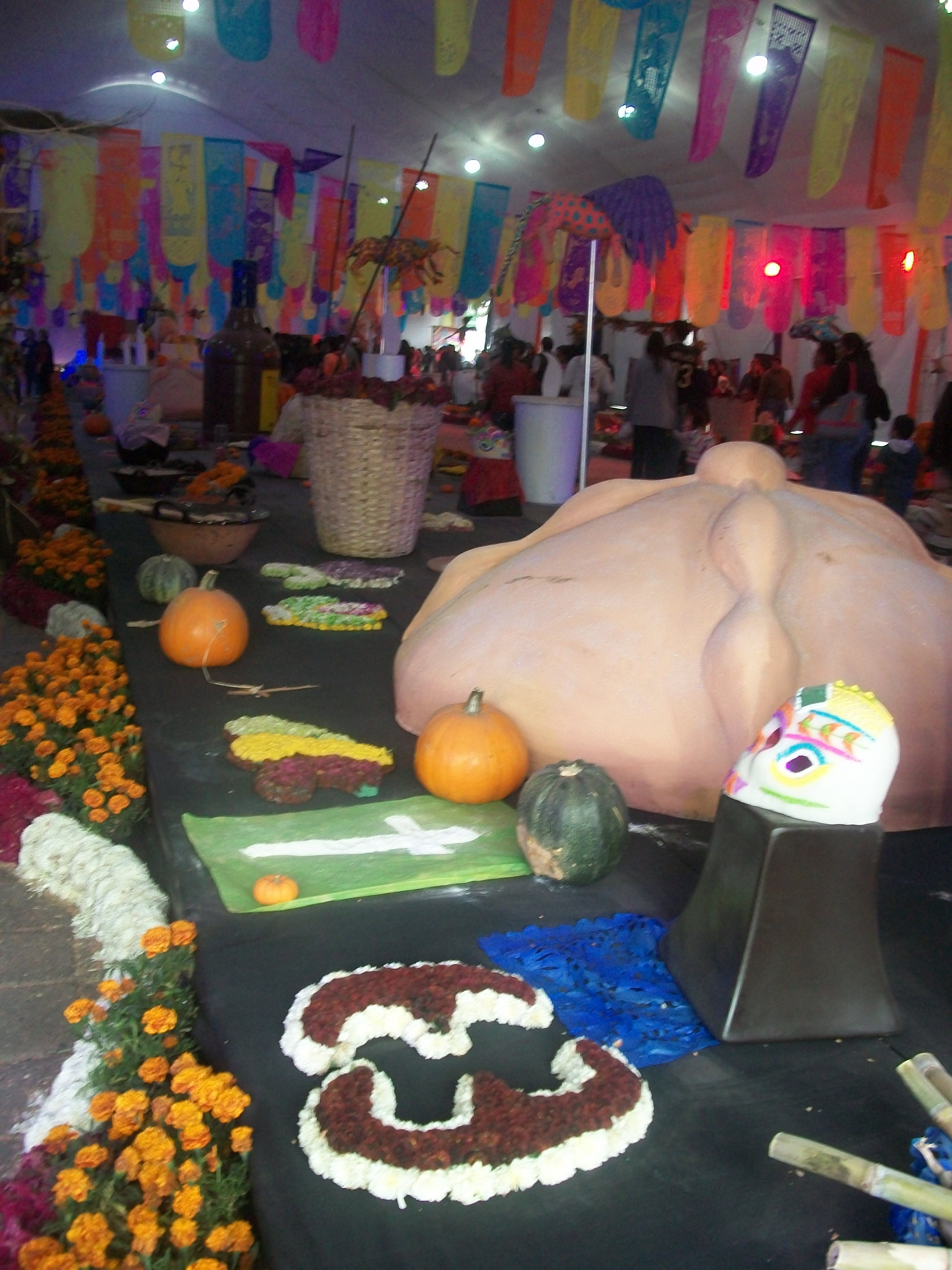
Large scale altar for Day of the Dead

The Passion Play of Iztapalapa has its origin in an outbreak of cholera in 1833, which left many dead and many children orphaned. A procession was performed to an image of Christ called the “Señor de la Cuevita” (Lord of the Little Cave) to end the epidemic. When it subsided, it was considered a miracle and various cults to this Christ figure appeared. Expressions of gratitude to this figure eventually consolidated into two annual events. The first is a Mass in honor of these images, now known as the Fiesta de Solteras de Septiembre. The second is the annual Passion Play.

The Passion Play is considered to be part of “folk religion,” supported by clergy but not considered to be liturgy. The Passion Play has antecedents in the plays put on by evangelizers to teach the Catholic faith and to get the indigenous to renounce their former beliefs. However, the passion play incorporates areas which were special or sacred to the pre Hispanic world, including the gardens that once belonged to the emperor Cuitláhuac and the hill on which the New Fire ceremony was performed. The Passion Play started as a number of reenactment events held in a number of places in the borough during Lent and Holy Week, including a procession with the Señor de la Cuevita on the fifth Friday of Lent. However, by the early 20th century, one main passion play for the borough had come into existence. According to one local legend, Emiliano Zapata lent his horses for the 1914 version of the play.

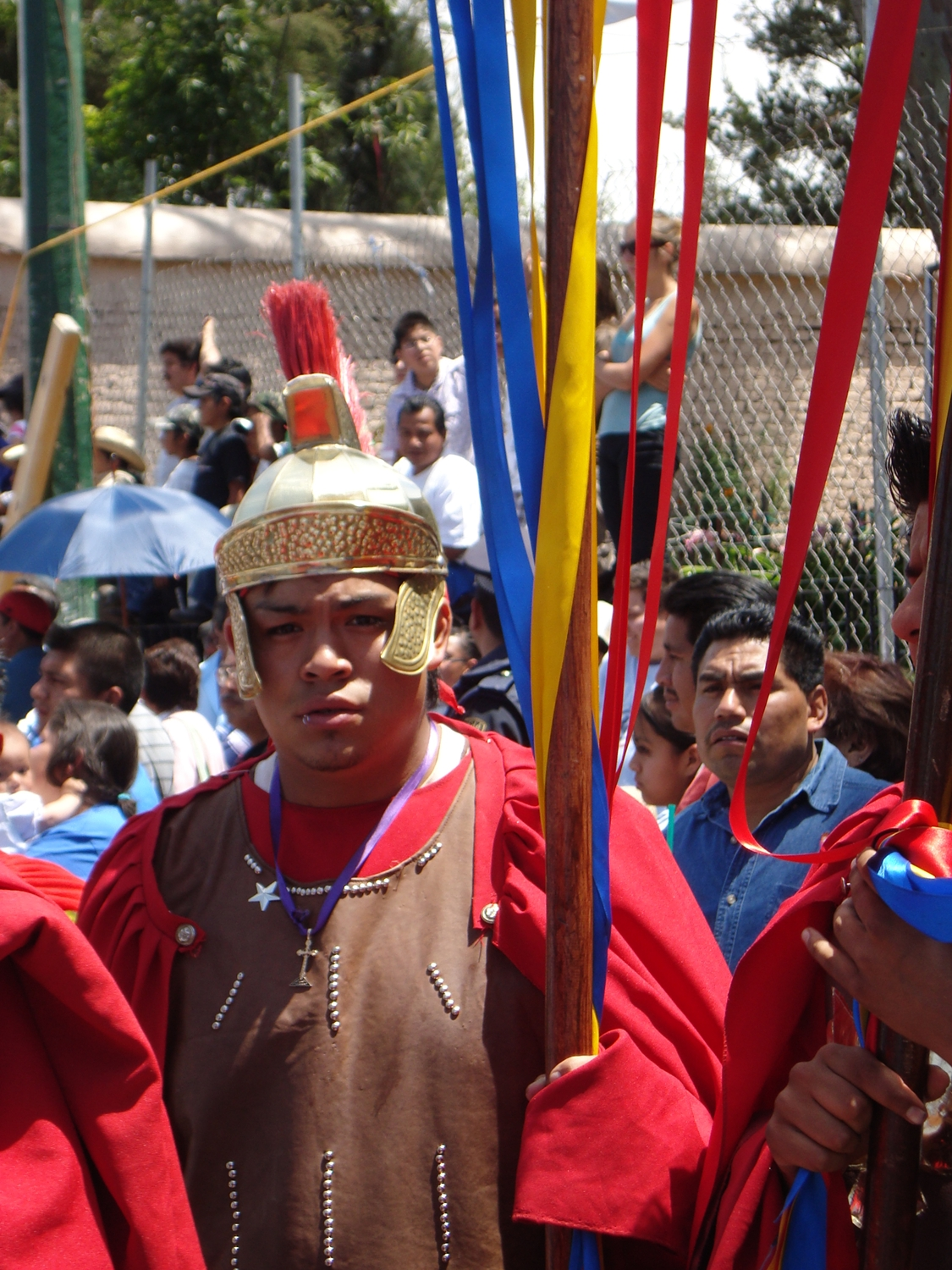
Participant dressed as Roman soldier

Since that time, this Passion Play has become a major event with the participation of 450 actors and attended by 2 million people over the course of the week and 2,000 police to provide security. This includes people from other parts of Mexico, from abroad and from the media. It is the most crowded and best known of its type in Mexico. The most crowded day is Good Friday, but as many as 40,000 are expected on Palm Sunday at the start of the event. The reenactments start on Palm Sunday and last until Easter Sunday with various Biblical scenes related to the life and death of Jesus played out. The most important episodes include the blessing of the palms on Palm Sunday, Maundy Thursday in the Cuitláhuac Garden, and Good Friday, with the sentencing, the crown of thorns and the crucifixion. At the Señor de la Cuevita Sanctuary, the scene of the expulsion of the money changers from the temple is re enacted. The Palm Sunday procession proceeds then to the Casa de la Mayordomía in the San Miguel barrio followed by hundreds dressed as Nazarenes and thousands more spectators. After the death of Jesus is played out, the “body” is lowered and taken to the Cuitláhuac Plaza where it is “buried” and “guarded” by people playing Roman soldiers. In 2010, the Passion Play was submitted to UNESCO to become an intangible cultural heritage.

Most Iztapalapa residents seek roles but not all are selected. The most coveted role is that of Jesus, which is selected each year by the Comité Organizador de Iztapalapa. Next is the role of the Virgin Mary. These are reserved for single young people, who do not have children, addictions, tattoos and can demonstrate their Catholic faith. The role of Jesus requires physical conditioning to carry the cross, which weight about 198 pounds. For a year, the chosen Jesus exercises daily as well as prays to prepare physically and spiritually. The Passion and Death are played out at the Cerro de la Estrella, emulating Calvary. The man playing Jesus must carry the cross 2.5 miles (4.0 km) from the center of Iztapalapa to the summit of the Cerro de las Estrellas to be crucified. The day after Easter Sunday the selection committee meets to choose the next Jesus and Mary.

While this Passion Play is the best known, events related to Holy Week take place in all parts and parishes of the borough including other re-enactments done by children as well as smaller events in Santiago Acahualtepec and Culhuacán which are more recent. Prisoners at the Reclusorio Oriente hold their own Passion Play with the involvement of about 80 people.

=== Nuevo Fuego Festival ===
The Festival del Fuego Nuevo (New Fire Festival) is an annual event held in November/December with events such as music, dance, theatre, cinema and art exhibitions. This event is named after the Aztec New Fire ceremony, which was celebrated every 52 years at the summit of the Cerro de la Estrella hill. This was a solemn ceremony when all fires were extinguished with a “new fire” ignited at night to provoke the return of the sun in the morning as well as the mark the beginning of a new 52-year cycle on the Aztec calendar. This “new fire” would then be distributed among the populace. The last ancient ceremony was held in 1507. While named for the ancient New Fire ceremony, the modern version is a cultural festival dedicated to the area's culture past and present. The festival is divided into four “axis” called “Traditions of the Ancient Mexicans,” “The Footsteps of Zapata,” “Sounds of the Underworld” and New Fire and Mexican Contemporary Cinema.”

=== Carnivals ===
Various neighborhoods hold celebrations for Carnival, which mostly consists of costumed groups, dance, live music and parades. These communities come together to hold a finale at the end of Carnival.

=== Other events ===
To celebrate the Christmas season, the borough sponsors various activities such as Christmas plays, processions “posadas” as well as cultural events such as dance recitals.

== History ==
Map of the Valley of Mexico in 1519, showing Iztapalapa and causeway running north from it to Villa Guadalupe.

=== Pre-colonial period ===
The borough is named after a city which was founded here in the pre-Hispanic period. "Iztapalapa" comes from Nahuatl and means "in the waters of the banks," referring to its position along the lakeshore, situated partly on dry land and partly over water

Like the pre-Hispanic villages of Xochimilco and Tláhuac, Iztapalapa began as a village on the shores of the lake system and dedicated to farming on chinampas. The first settlements on this side of Lake Texcoco were formed by refugees from the fall of Teotihuacan at the base of the Cerro de Culhuacán hill. These people were led by a chief named Mixcoatl and would become known as the Culhuas. At that time, the area was a peninsula jutting onto the lake formed by the Sierra de Santa Catarina. The first city on this peninsula was Culhuacán on the south side next to the Cerro de la Estrella, which grew to contain various neighborhoods surrounded by chinampas, or artificial islands in the lake used to grow food. These and the exploitation of lake resources was the basis of the city's economy.

Chinampa agriculture would be important in many areas of the Valley of Mexico, including the area of Iztapalapa. Chinampas here were made from reeds, tree branches and lake mud, growing corn, beans and wide variety of vegetables. These chinampas, now known as neighborhoods called Tezontitla, El Bordo, El Moral, Las Largas, Las Cuadradas, Tecorrales, Zapotla and others were separated by small canals and some of them had docks. They were also an ecosystem home to wide variety of land and aquatic flora and fauna, including storks, flowers, trees, reeds, quetzals, frogs, and fish. The chinampas remained in private hands until 1970, when they were expropriated to construct the Central de Abasto, which eliminated them.

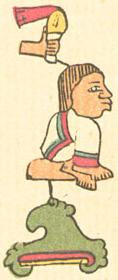
Image of Xilomatzin, one of the rulers of Culhuacan

Culhuacan was moved to a site called Tollantzingo in the 950s, and shortly after that migrants from Tula came into the area to settle as well, bringing with them the worship of Quetzalcoatl. Other pre-Hispanic settlements in the Iztapalapa area were established and grew as well, including Hitzilopochco (Churubusco), Mexicaltzingo and Iztapalapa. These would be the four main settlements of the area, with close relations that would last into the colonial era, when they were part of the Mexicaltzingo corregimiento. The village of Iztapalapa has its origins in the fall of Teotihuacan in the 8th century. Ancient Iztapalapa has alliances and disputes mostly with the other dominions with economies based on chinampas, such as Xochimilco, Chalco and Mixquic.

By the 11th century, the Toltec descendants had become dominant with the area with Culhuacán becoming the capital of a dominion in 1114. The main rulers of this city included Nauhyotl, Cuauhtexpetlatzin, Huetzin, Nonoalcatle and Cuauhtonal who ruled between 1120 and 1251. In the middle of the 13th century, the Toltecs were displaced by the Chichimecas, who ruled it from 1250 to 1400 under various rulers.

==== Aztec Empire ====
One of the tribes that moved into the Valley of Mexico in the 14th century were the Mexica, at a time when the city of Culhuacán was powerful. However, the area was divided into a number of dominions around the lake system of the valley, which vied among themselves for dominance. As late arrivals, the Mexica wandered among the various dominions and were granted permission to settle in Culhuacán territory. They lived together mostly peacefully. However, records indicate that the Mexicas were forced into servitude as punishment for raids by young warriors to carry off women from neighboring settlements. One legend states that problems between the two peoples began when the Mexica asked for and received a Culhua princess, Achitómetla, to become a goddess of war. The ceremony required the woman to be sacrificed, angering Culhuacán. The Mexica were eventually forced off Culhua lands and forced to settle on an island on the west side of the lake, although the stronger city of Culhuacán maintained relations with them. This new settlement, called Tenochtitlan, would begin rising and dominating since its establishment in 1325. The Aztec Triple Alliance would be formed in the early 15th century, as part of the process of uniting the Nahuatl-speaking peoples of the valley.

Part of this process included legitimizing the lineage Tenochtitlan's rulers. These Mexica rulers used the time they spent in Culhuacán territory, and the links formed from it for this purpose. The ruling family could trace its ancestors back to Culhuacán ruler Nahuyotl. This and various marital ties from the past would make these new rulers descendants from the old. This was formalized with the government of Acamapichtli, who was granted the title of “culhua tecuhtli” (Lord of the Culhuas) . The Alliance came to include thirty dominions, with Tenochtitlan, Texcoco and Tlacopan, with Texcoco dominating the formerly powerful city of Culhuacán as well as Iztapalapa. As Tenochtitlan's power grew, it eventually ruled the new empire alone.

As one of the first members of the Alliance, Iztapalapa was not conquered. It was indirectly ruled by Tenochtitlan as part of a confederation of four city-states (along with Mexicaltzingo, Huitzilopochco and Culhuacán) allied with the Mexica. Later, Itzcoatl’s son, Huehua Cuitlahuatzin would be made ruler of Iztapalapa. Under this arrangement, Iztapalapa did not pay tribute to Tenochtitlan, but instead they were obligated to supply labor for major projects as well as military service. Iztapalapa was important in pre Hispanic times militarily and religiously as the side of the Huixachtécatl, today called the Cerro de la Estrella. This was the site of the New Fire ceremony, held once every 52 years, beginning anew cycle of years. The ceremony also required the destruction of all household goods to be replaced by new. Women and children would stay at home while the men participated in the distribution of the “new fire.” It was celebrated a total of nine times, with the last one in 1507 (2 acatl by the Aztec calendar). For this last celebration, Moctezuma had a temple construction on the summit called the Ayauhcalli, later named “the church of the New Fire” by the Spanish.

=== Colonial period ===
By the time the Spanish arrived, Culhuacán was no longer an important city; rather it had been eclipsed by Iztapalapa as one of the Aztec royal towns, chosen as such due to its defensive position. At that time, the area has about 10,000 inhabitants dedicated to chinampa agriculture and the raising of fish and birds. A causeway linking Iztapalapa and Tenochtitlan was one of the most important roads in the area. The construction of this causeway began in 1429 under Itzcoatl, using labor from peoples from the south of the valley such as the Xochimilcas. It consisted of artificial land built up from the shallow lake bottom, rising about a meter and a half over the lake's surface and extending for about 8 kilometres (5.0 mi). It was wide enough for horses to cross in pairs. The causeway was divided by a fort called Xoloc, made of stone with towers, merlons and gates to control entrance and exit. This causeway also had a branch leading to Coyoacán. Its ruler was Cuitláhuac, born in 1476 as younger brother of Moctezuma Ilhuicamina and son of Axayacatl. Cuitláhuac received the Spanish in Iztapalapa before they went onto Tenochtitlan. They met in a garden which most Aztec lords had as a refuge and to demonstrate culture. In the center of the garden was a large palace made of sandstone and fine woods such as cedar.

In 1519, the Spanish took Moctezuma, Cacamatzin (ruler of Texcoco), Cuitláhuac and other nobles as prisoners. Cortés was then forced to return to Veracruz to face Spanish authorities, leaving Pedro de Alvarado in charge. Alvarado had hundreds of Aztec nobles killed. After Cortés returned, he liberated Cuitláhuac in exchange for supplies, allowing the lord to organize an army against the Spanish. Cuitláhuac succeeded Moctezuma as Aztec emperor and forced the Spanish to flee during the Noche Triste. However, Cuitláhuac was ruler only somewhere between 40 and 80 days according to various records. He spent that time repairing the city of Tenochtitlan as the Spanish regrouped in Tlaxcala. Cuitláhuac died of smallpox in December 1520, with Cuauhtémoc succeeding him.

After the Spanish and their allies regrouped in Tlaxcala, Cortés decided to attack Iztapalapa before besieging the Aztec capital of Tenochtitlan, in part to secure supplies. The city of Iztapalapa had about 10,000 people with about two-thirds of its structures built over water. Eight thousand Aztecs defended the city on land and on water. Cortés and his indigenous allied burned, massacred and destroyed the city completely, killing 6,000 of the city's residents. But after the battle, when the Spanish let down their guard, Iztapalapa opened water channels to flood the city and drown the invaders. Most of the Spanish survived, but many of their Indian allies did not and were drowned. The Spanish lost all of their gunpowder.

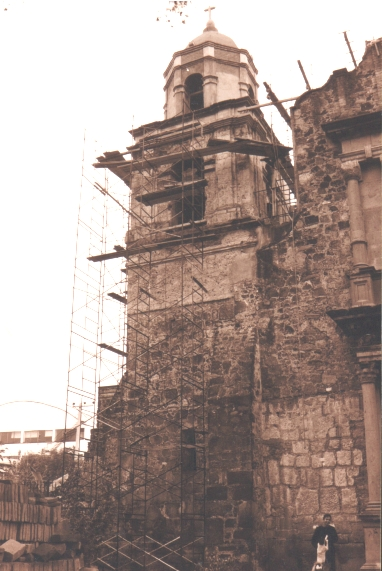
View of the San Lucas Church in Iztapalapa

After the Conquest, the pre-Hispanic temples of the area were destroyed, the Iztapalapa and surrounding cities were subjugated by Gonzalo de Sandoval. The process was brutal, as the area was highly loyal to Tenochtitlan, with more than 5,000 people killed by both war and epidemics. By the first census of the Viceroyalty of New Spain in 1552, Culhuacan was down to 817 inhabitants, and 260 in Mexicaltzingo.

Following the destruction of the temples, Augustinians and Franciscans moved in to build churches and monasteries. The Augustinians began construction of the Culhuacán monastery in 1552, built in various stages. It was dedicated to John the Baptist. They founded a school to teach indigenous languages which operated for 100 years. The Franciscans built a monastery in Huitzilopochco as well as small churches in San Marcos Mexicaltzingo and in Santa Marta and Nativitas Tepetlacingo. The churches of San Lucas Evangelista, San Marcos Mexicaltzingo, San Juan Evangelista and the chapels of Calvario and Santa Martha Acatitla were all built over foundations of pre-Hispanic temples which the Spanish had destroyed. These were built with much of the material from the destroyed temples. However, by the end of the 18th century, all of these would be in the hands of normal clergy.

Iztapalapa and several other nearby communities were under the direct control of Mexico City, but shortly after only Iztapalapa would remain so. Mexicaltzingo belonged to the Spanish Empire from early on. Iztapalapa became a tributary of Mexico City, required to provide food, manual labor and more. At the end of the 16th century, it too became property of the Spanish Crown. Other areas of the modern borough were made into encomiendas. Culhuacan came under the control of Cristóbal de Oñate, which remained in the family until the system was abolished. Later in the colonial period, the area would become a corregimiento headed by Mexicaltzingo and later an “alcaldia mayor” as it grew to include areas such as Los Reyes and Santa Marta.

During the colonial period, Iztapalapa was very rural, notable only as one of the primary providers of produce and flowers to Mexico City and its lake and canal transportation. Culhuacán had eighteen villages surrounding it in the pre Hispanic era, butby the 18th century, only San Lorenzo Tezonco and Santiago Acahualtepec remained. In the middle of the 18th century, there were still only 80 families in Iztapalapa, with 31 of them being Spanish. By the end of the same century, that would become 130 indigenous families distributed into nine barrios and three villages. At the end of the colonial period Iztapalapa would also include three haciendas and two ranches. During much of this time, Iztapalapa was also a stopover for travelers between Mexico City and Puebla or Veracruz. There were two main canals through here that connected the area with Chalco and Xochimilco. One of these was the Canal de la Viga, which was an important means of transporting corn, beans, vegetables and more into the capital These canals had control and customs checkpoints which divided Mexico City from rural areas. The most important of these was the La Viga control point due to the merchandise that passed through.

=== Independence ===
After the Mexican War of Independence, the Federal District of Mexico City was established as the new nation's capital in 1824. The village of Iztapalapa became part of this district at the same time, but the borough had not yet been established. It would remain an autonomous settlement. In 1828, it was one of the municipalities outside of Mexico City proper. The rest of the 19th century would be concerned with disease and the status of the area's water transportation.

A cholera epidemic in 1833 prompted the first passion play to be performed in this area, which has been performed since. In the middle of the 19th century, the town of Iztapalapa had 3,416 inhabitants. Drainage of the lakes in the Valley of Mexico would have an effect on the size and arrangement of water transportation. According to records, the ancient “Calzada de los Indios” (Indian Causeway) that linked Iztapalapa and the Villa Guadalupe was destroyed in 1835. Much of what is now the borough was lake or crisscrossed by various canals, which carried barge, canoe and even steamship traffic until the late 19th century. New canals were dug to connect Mexico City with Peñón Viejo, Chalco and San Isidro as well as the villages of Ayotla, Tlapicahua and Tlapacoya. By the end of this century, much of the lake and many of the small canals had dried. The main ones were the Mexicaltzingo canal and those near the Churubusco River. The Mexicalcingo canal was widened for steamships.

The canals would remain a part of the borough until the mid-20th century. Efforts to preserve the system began in 1920, when ejido owners turned over land to construct new ones. In the 1930s, many of the barrios of Iztapalapa were still marked by canals and still grew vegetables, fruits and flowers. Major traffic was confined mostly to the Canal Nacional on the borough's border. However, groundwater pumping started in the 1950s lowered water tables and began the process of destroying the rest of the canals, and most of the chinampas along with them.

Industrialization began in the area in the 1890s but agriculture remained the most important economic activity. Most of the population in the area still lived in poor huts. In 1916, the haciendas and ranches of Iztapalapa were broken up and divided into ejidos; however the area remained extremely poor and there were disputes between Iztapalapa and neighboring Zapotitlán over ejido land. In 1920, the population was over 20,000 Iztapalapa would remain rural and poor until the 1950s, when its population and its urbanization began in earnest. In the 1940s, the urban sprawl of Mexico City had reached sections of the borough and furthering this was promoted by the federal government which favored industry over agriculture. In 1940, the chinampas suffered when the Canal de la Viga was drained, and only runoff from the Cerro de la Estrella was still available. Groundwater pumping dried swamps, allowing for more urbanization.

Iztapalapa had been semi-independent of Mexico City since the colonial era, but politically organized in various ways. It has been part of the Federal District since it was created, but this District was an unstable entity in the Reform War as Liberals, who favored a federalist government, fought with Conservatives, who favored a more centralized regime. Thus much of the borough would either be part of the Federal District or the State/Department of Mexico, depending on who was in power during the first half of the 19th century. The Federal District, including Iztapalapa, would be permanently restored in 1848, and then enlarged to its current dimensions between 1853 and 1854. Since that time, the Federal District has been reorganized several times, usually separating Mexico City and making the other areas of the District either districts or municipalities.

==== Modern history (1923-present) ====
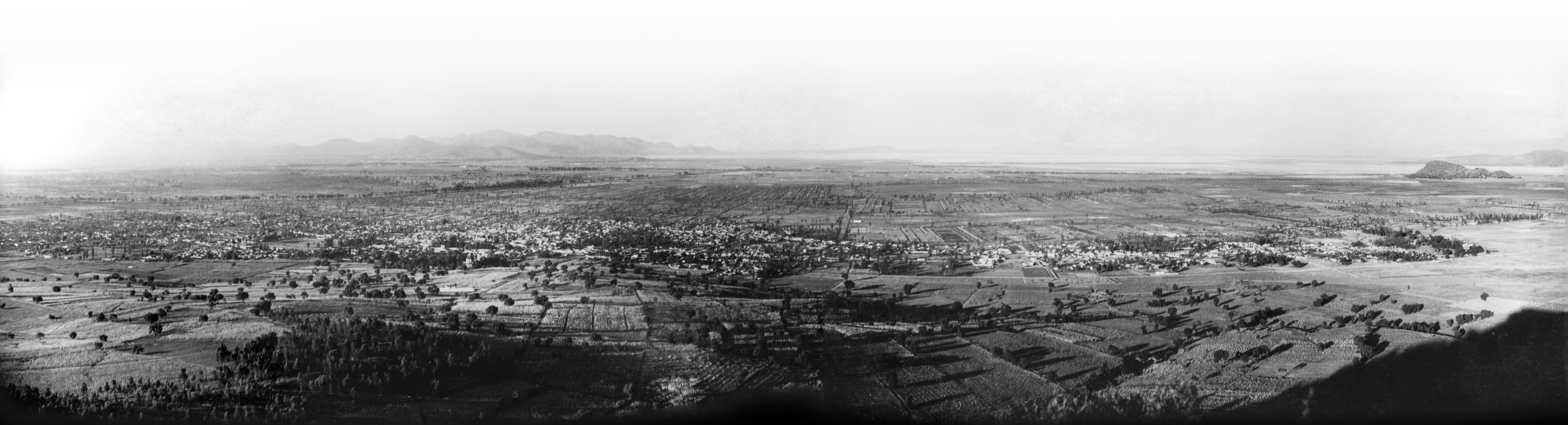
Panorama of Iztapalapa in the 1940's, from Cerro de la Estrella

The current borough was established in 1928, which created the current borough of Iztapalapa, centered on and named over the former municipality of Iztapalapa. This borough's government was appointed by the Mexican federal government until 1970, when borough presidents began to be democratically elected.

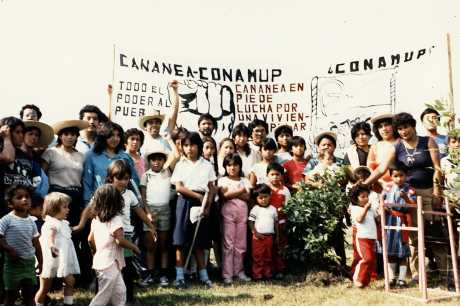
Groundbreaking for an apartment complex in the 1980s in the borough

From the 1950s to the present, the borough's history has been dominated by its population growth and urbanization, along with the problems that come with it. Before 1970, the area still had various types of flora including forested hills, ponds and other surface water, grasslands and more. Chinampas and other farmland still existed as well. In the 1970s, waves of migrants from other parts of the country began to move into the borough. This prompted the building of a number of large apartment complexes including Unidad Vicente Guerrero, Unidad Ejército de Oriente, Unidad Santa Cruz Meyehualco, Conjunto Urbano Popular Ermita Zaragoza and Unidad Habitacional Ejército Constitucionalista. By 1980, all of the land that could be developed legally was, but the population continued to grow.

In the 1990s, the borough had growth rates of over 100% according to INEGI. By 2000, the population of the borough accounted for over 20% of the total of the Federal District, the largest in population. Now almost all of the land in the borough has been urbanized, with only the highest elevations and a few family farm plots without buildings. The only green spaces are parks controlled by local or federal authorities, where various types of trees can still be found.

In 2006, there was a dispute in the election for borough president between activist Rafael Acosta Ángeles, better known as “Juanito”, and Clara Brugada, then a former federal deputy. Juanito and supporters blocked the main entrance to the borough offices, but allowed employees access through other entrances. The protest was to have him declared the winner of borough president elections. In the end, Brugada retained the position.

During the 2010s, Iztapalapa was affected by severe water shortages in September 2017 following the 2017 Puebla earthquake, and in October and November of 2018. In 2020, Iztapalapa was disproportionately impacted by the COVID-19 pandemic and its economic consequences. The New York Times described Iztapalapa as the 'epicenter' of the COVID-19 pandemic in Mexico, with the borough's density and high rates of poverty cited as reasons why.

== Notable people ==
- Los Ángeles Azules, music group
- Ignacio Ambríz, former soccer player and coach
- Daniel Estrada, boxer
- Silvia Pérez Ceballos, politician
- Horacio Martínez Meza, politician
- Ricardo Marín, soccer player
- Pancho Cárdenas, artist.
- Mau Nieto, comedian and game show host
