= Silvia Pérez Ceballos =

Mexican politician

- Born: 25 May 1971 (age 54); Iztapalapa, Mexico City, Mexico
- Occupation: Politician
- Political party: PAN

Silvia Esther Pérez Ceballos (born 25 May 1971) is a Mexican politician from the National Action Party. From 2009 to 2012 she served as Deputy of the LXI Legislature of the Mexican Congress representing the Federal District.
