= Canal Nacional =

Man-made waterway

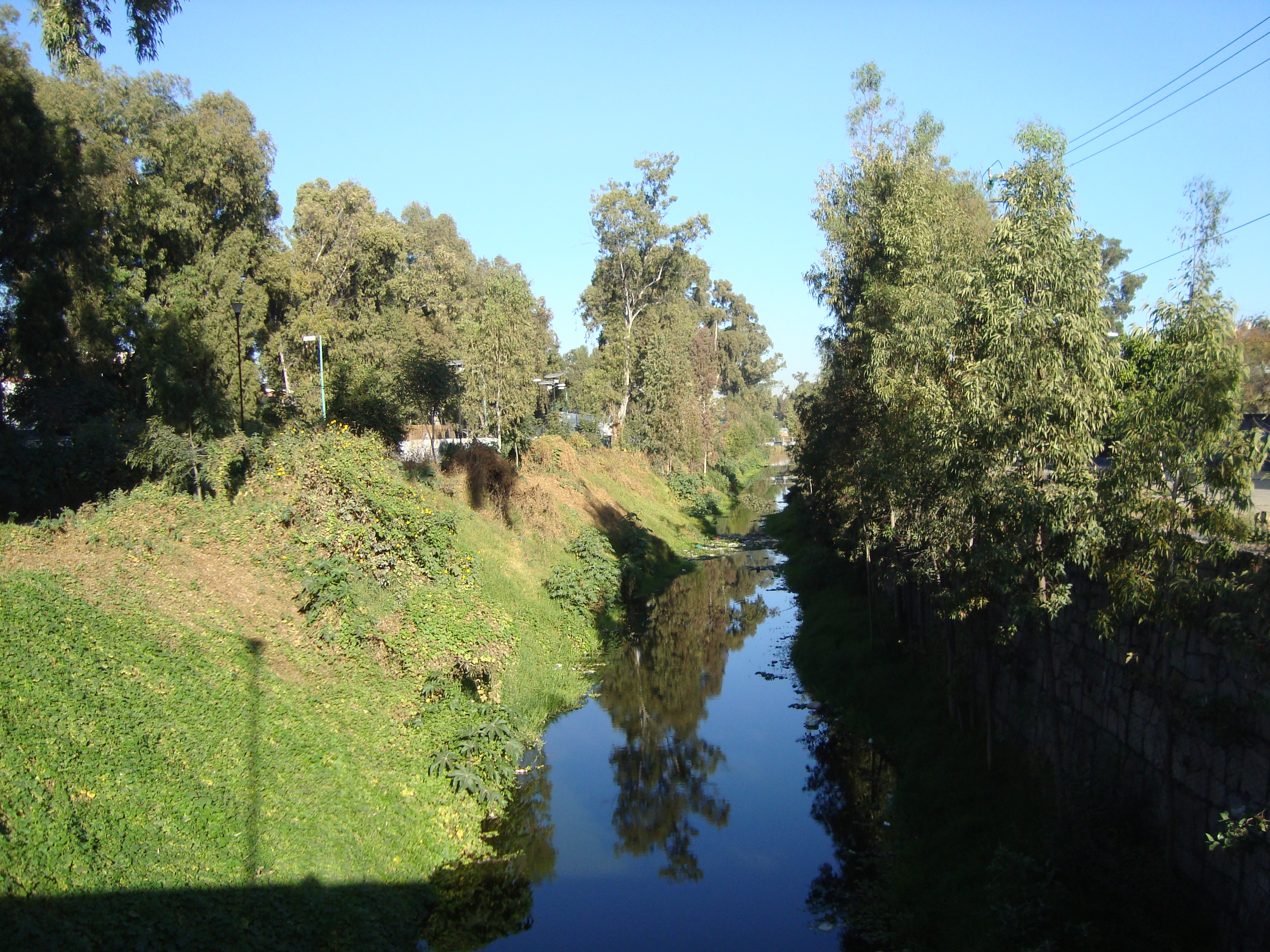
View of the canal in San Andrés Tomatlán

Canal Nacional is a man-made waterway linking the Mexico City's center with Xochimilco in the southern part of the city. The waterway had been used for transportation since the pre-Hispanic time to the 1950s. It was also used as water supply as it drew from the same springs in the Lake Xochimilco and Lake Chalco areas.

Since the 1950s, many rivers and canals in the city have been closed to make space for city expansion. Canal Nacional is the only remaining artificial open air channel in the city. In 1993, the government planned to turn Canal Nacional into a roadway. That was faced with a strong resistance from the residents. Today, the community members try to come up with a plan to preserve the waterway and engage people in active uses of it.

Canal Nacional was listed as one of 25 sites of the 2020 World Monuments Watch published by World Monuments Fund (WMF) to highlight historical sites that deserve an immediate attention in preservation efforts.
