= Cerro de la Estrella National Park =

National park in Mexico

Coordinates: 19°20′39.08″N 99°5′28.27″W

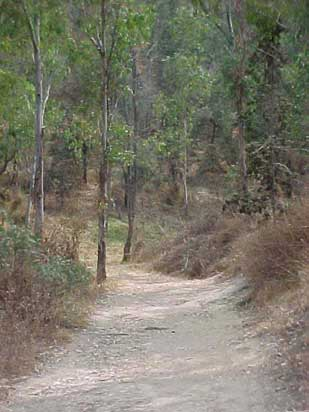
Walking path in Cerro de la Estrella National Park.

Cerro de la Estrella National Park is centered on the Cerro de la Estrella mountain which is located entirely within eastern Mexico City, in the borough of Iztapalapa.

The park was originally designated in 1938 with 1,100 hectares, but the growth of the city has encroached on it and left it with less than 200 hectares. The park is meant to provide cultural and recreational opportunity as well as to protect the mountain, which is important archaeologically and culturally as the site of the pre Hispanic New Fire ceremony and the modern-day Passion Play. Archaeological remains include temples related to the ceremony and older structures such as housing units, petroglyphs, and a major temple related to the Teotihuacan culture. The park and the archaeological sites remain in danger of destruction by encroachment, use of land for agriculture, graffiti and the dumping of garbage.

== Description ==
The park was originally declared in 1938 with about 1,100 hectares but today it is considered to have somewhere between 143 and 192. The park is completely within Mexico City, located in the borough of Iztapalapa bordering the boroughs of Tláhuac and Milpa Alta, bordered by major thoroughfares such as Calzada Ermita Iztapalapa and Calzada México-Tulyehualca.

Most of the administration of the park falls under the Secretaría de Agricultura y Recursos Hidráulicos, with the objectives being a recreational and cultural zone for the borough to increase tourism. Of all the parks and green spaces in the city, it is the most abused with seasonal farming, illegal human settlements, areas used for grazing, the extraction of minerals, the dumping of garbage and even a cemetery. A wall has been constructed around parts of the park to protect it, especially the archeological site, from further encroachments by surrounding neighborhoods.

== Natural history ==
The park is centered on the Cerro de la Estrella, a small mountain 2,450 metres (8,040 ft) above sea level and 224 metres (735 ft) above the city. It is the highest point in the borough of Iztapalapa. The hill is also called Huizachtepetl which means “mountain of thorns.” It was made by volcanic processes, as part of the small mountain chain in the Valley of Mexico called the Sierra de Santa Catarina. The area serves as a recharge area for aquifers to the east of the city.

The original wildlife of the area is extinct, and most animals here now are rodents, including squirrels. The trees are mostly Eucalyptus, Pinus patula pine, and some white cedar, all planted in reforestation projects.

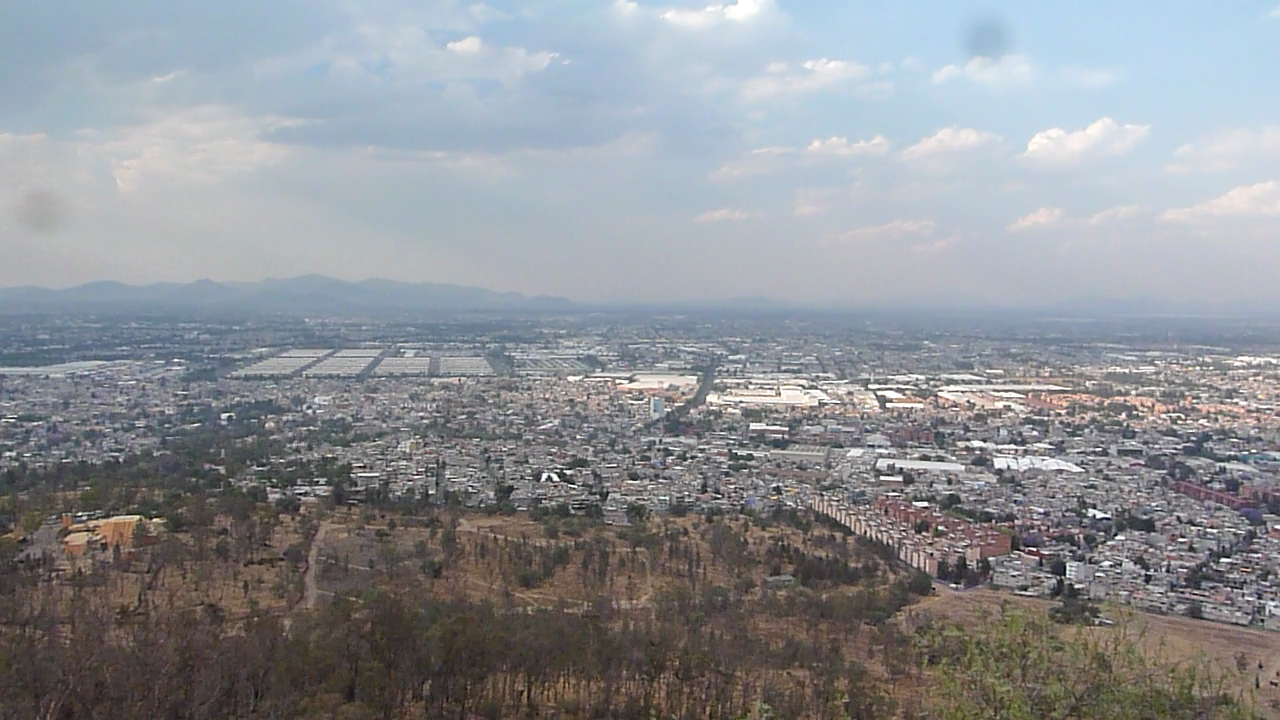
Hilltop view of Mexico City from the park.

== Recreation ==
Recreational facilities include picnic tables, grills, playgrounds, sports facility and a lookout point. Sporting activities practiced in the park include hiking and running. The picnic area is administered by the borough and the Secretariat of Education, which provides activities for schoolchildren. The lookout point at the top of the hill provides one of the best views of the city. It has benches with pre Hispanic motifs and five telescopes for viewing.

The park is filled with small caves, especially on the mountain proper. These caves have been a source of ghost stories and legends in the area, which include stories about the Devil, and youths lost in them. Another states that there is a tunnel under the hill that connects with a cemetery.

The hill and park are the scene of the annual Passion Play, which ascends the main road of the park to the Museo del Fuego Nuevo . The Passion Play attracts thousands of visitors each year with its highlight being the reenactment of the Crucifixion at a place called Calvario but is really the base of a Teotihuacan era pyramid.

== History ==
The park was established by President Lázaro Cárdenas in 1938, with an original area of 1,100 hectares. However, the growth of Mexico City has encroached on the park, despite various attempts to protect it, reducing its size by about ninety percent and stripping away all of its wild vegetation. The trees there now are due to reforestation efforts.

=== Mesoamerican ===
The area of the park was inhabited from at least the mid Pre Classic period, to the Spanish conquest and for the most part, the present day. Very early settlements were village and on near the mountain’s slopes. The largest settlement near the mountain was Culhuacan, founded around 900 CE by the Chichimeca. By the 15th century, the Mexicas had control of the area.

During the pre-Columbian period, the Cerro de la Estrella was called Huizachtecatl, or Sacred Mountain, the site of the New Fire ceremony performed once every 52 years. The most important archeological remains in the park are related to this. The last New Fire ceremony took place in 1507. Today, the hill remains important culturally, as the scene of Iztapalapa’s annual Passion Play.

==== Archeology ====
Archeological finds at the Cerro de la Estrella archeological site relate to the Teotihuacan, Toltec, Chichimeca and Culhua-Mexica cultures and range from 1500 BCE to 1521. Excavations have found the Temple of the New Fire, the Sanctuary, the Villa Estrellas, 144 caves, the remains of walls and evidence of terracing. The most important of these is the former plaza and temple of the New Fire Ceremony, which is on the top of the hill. This archeological site can be visited through a guided tour.

However, early archeological remains can be found in many parts of the park, including those which have since been covered over by urban sprawl.

Ceramic and stone sculpture materials were discovered in the west side of Huizachtecatl that apparently was made within the 100 to 500 years CE; these resemble other similar pieces found in Zacatenco, north of Mexico City. The constructions here were built between the year 100 and 650 AD and are located in the north side, the remains consist of foundations and walls of palaces that show Teotihuacán influence. Another area was housing zone at the middle of the hill, built during the late Classic period (600 to 900 CE). In 2003, specialists from the Instituto Nacional de Antropología e Historia (INAH) worked to document petroglyphs found in various areas of the park, registering 210 in eleven groups, but they believe there are still more. Some of the petroglyphs are aligned with certain annual solar events.

The most recent find was in 2006, when a pyramid base was discovered in what is called Calvary at the top of the mountain. This base dates to the Teotihuacan period, about 1300 years ago. INAH has decided not to excavate the base.

== Threats to park ==
=== Encroachment + appropriation ===
Since its establishment in 1938, the park has shrunk in size from 1,100 hectares to somewhere between 143 and 192 hectares. This is due to illegal settlements and other encroachment onto the land, which even includes the Panteón Civil San Nicolás Tolentino cemetery in the original designated area. The settlements have been made by groups of poor people, unable to purchase or rent living space. Later these groups organized to regularize their possession of the land. Some of this has not been by the poor, but by those able to build houses and buy cars shortly after they have legal possession of the land.

To try and stop this process various other laws and declarations have been applied to the areas including declaring et a Zona Ecological y Cultural of Mexico City in 1999 and putting under the Ley Federal sobre Monumentos y Zonas Arqueológicos, Artísticos e Históricos in 2007. However, these efforts have not been sufficient to guarantee the preservation of the park. As of 2009, there were about 180 families inside the park proper. The 2007 effort made the park and some areas outside an archeological zone under INAH, but the agency has not acted to move those living within the area. Instead it only requires that buildings be no more than two stories tall and to be notified before any major excavation so that salvage operations can be done. One last effort to stop encroachment, especially in the major archeological areas has been two stretches of border wall, the last constructed in 2009.

Another danger to the land is the appropriation of it for use for growing crops and as pasture, with fires lit in the area to clear space.

=== Destruction ===
Most of the danger archeologically has been to the numerous petroglyphs and caves in the park area. The park contains over 200 petroglyphs at risk of destruction. The Matlolotzin group of petroglyphs are found on the south side of the hill and are the most damaged by graffiti. Some have even been erased by the use to acid to give the impression that there is no heritage here to save.

There are also more than 110 small caves which are important geologically and culturally, with evidence of human habitation over various epochs. Some of the more accessible caves have been damaged by people, including Concheros dancers using them for ceremonies. The Passion Play attracts thousands of visitors who also damage areas including caves.

Many of the caves were sealed off by those who took over the land and more have been filed with garbage and graffiti.
