= Cerro de la Estrella (archaeological site) =

Archaeological site in Central Mexico

Coordinates: 19°20′37″N 99°05′24″W

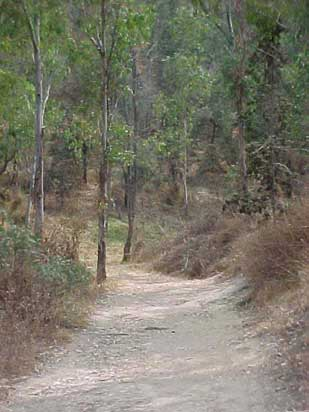
Cerro de la Estrella

Cerro de la Estrella is a Mesoamerican archaeological site located in southeastern Central Mexico's Valley of Mexico, in the Iztapalapa alcaldía (English: mayoralty) of Mexico City at an elevation of 2460 meters (8070 ft) above sea level, hence its Summit is 224 m over the Valley of Mexico level. At the southeast edge of what was the Great Texcoco Lake.

Historical sources establish that ancient inhabitants of the Mexican Plateau knew this place as Huizachtecatl. The site was very important since the “New Fire” ritual ceremony was performed here; it had a profound meaning for the population here and in surrounding regions.

== Occupation stages ==
The oldest traces of human occupation in the Iztapalapa territory originated at Santa María Aztahuacan village. In 1953 remains of two individuals were found and, according to analysis performed by National University of Mexico (UNAM) and by Instituto Nacional de Antropología e Historia, these human remains are approximately nine thousand years old.

More recent archaeological materials indicate continued occupation of the Cerro de la Estrella slopes, at least from the Preclassical period. At that time, a village related to the Cuicuilco culture was established here. Cuicuilco, in the South of the Valley of Mexico, declined approximately in 150 CE possibly due to the eruption of the Xitle volcano.

Towards the end of the Preclassical period commenced occupation by Culhuacán. During the classical period, Culhuacán, as most cities in the Valley of Mexico and Mesoamerica, was part of a trade system centered in Teotihuacan. After the fall of this city, approximately in the 8th century d. C., some of its inhabitants took refuge in the ancient coastal towns of Texcoco Lake such as Culhuacán. A cultural Teotihuacan haven remained there, later merged with warrior peoples, migrating towards the center of México.

== Site ==
Archaeological investigations reveal indications of constructions built as early as 100 to 650 AD, and it was inhabited from the mid preclassical period (1000 AD) up to the Spaniards arrival. First settlers of the site used the Huizachtecatl slopes, where villages were founded; they had early farming systems and had a rudimentary social organization. It is believed that these groups made the stone glyphs found in the place known as “Cerro Chiquito” or small hill.

Ceramic and stone sculpture materials were discovered in the west side of Huizachtecatl, apparently made within the 100 to 500 years AD; these resemble other similar pieces found in Zacatenco, north of México City. The constructions here were built between the year 100 and 650 AD and are located in the North side, the remains consist of foundations and walls of palaces that indicate Teotihuacán’s influence.

Archaeological evidence reveals the existence of a housing zone in the middle of the hill, built during the late Classic period (600 to 900 AD). At that time numerous civil type structures were constructed because of the increased population. Unfortunately, remains are lost under present constructions.

Sahagún, Motolinia, Torquemada and the Cuautitlán Annals, among other sources, indicate that between the period 900 to 1300 AD, Chichimecan peoples inhabited the western section of the hill, where they founded the town of Colhuacan. These settlers achieved important technological and social development; apparently a theocratic system prevailed and later by a dynasty of kings. Between years 1300 and 1521 AD, the Aztecs conquered the area and established a settlement, naming it Ixtapalapa. They hoped that Ixtapalapa, in conjunction with the neighboring altepetl Colhuacan, would serve as a barrier to protect the area south of Tenochtitlan, in addition to providing the empire with staples. It is known that at that time, the Aztecs constructed platforms the top of the hill.

== New Fire ceremony ==
The Mexicans conceived the universe as a four petal great flower, at the center of which was Tenochtitlan. Each petal represented one of the four cardinal points; the region to the east was symbolized by the acatl glyph (cane), the west by calli (house), the north by tecpatl (flint stone knife) and the south by tochitl (rabbit). As an inherited Toltec tradition, they worshiped the Sun, deity that governed life of all beings and thought that human hearts were required to please him in addition to the blood on prisoner soldiers.

For that reason, every 52 years, when the beginning of the calendars (Civil and Religious) coincided, the sacerdotal class performed the New Fire ceremony, to prevent the Sun’s death, as they thought, would cause total darkness of the universe, allowing the sprouting of tsitsimeme, entities that ate human beings.

At dusk of the great day the main priests wore their best clothes and headed by the priest of Copilco, went to the top of Huizachtecatl to initiate the ceremony. Previously, a prisoner was placed in the main temple altar, and when the time came, a log or mamahuastli was placed on his chest and set on fire to ignite the New Fire; meanwhile, Tenochtitlan and towns surrounding the great lake remained in complete darkness. The Copilco priest took the fire from the chest and transmitted it to a bonfire. Later the prisoner was sacrificed, his heart extracted and thrown into the flames. There were messengers responsible to deliver torches lit with the New Fire to priests of towns that had attended the ceremony at Huizachtecatl.

At Tenochtitlan the fire was placed before the main deity, from where it was taken to other Gods temples, and from there to people’s quarters.

Based on archeological investigations, Colhuas were the first to use the top of the hill for the New Fire or Toxiuhmopolli ceremony; historical sources indicate that four such ceremonies took place; in 1351, 1403, 1455 and 1507. Tenochtitlan was conquered before the fifth ceremony could take place.
