= Zacateco language =

Extinct Uto-Aztecan language

Zacatec
- Zacateco
- zʼapa
- Native to: Mexico
- Region: Zacatecas, Durango
- Ethnicity: Zacateco
- Extinct: (date missing)
- Language family: Uto-Aztecan: Nahuan? Corachol?; Zacatec

Language codes
- ISO 639-3: None (mis)
- Glottolog: None
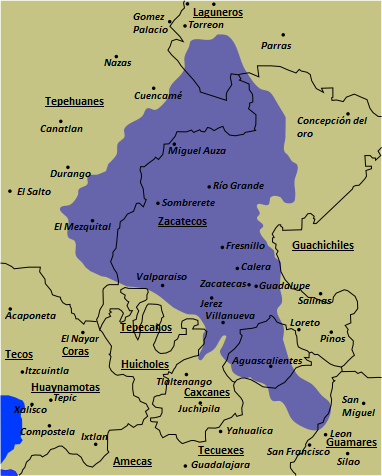
- Territory of the Zacatecs

The Zacatec language is an extinct and poorly attested language, likely of the Uto-Aztecan language family. It has been suspected to be a Nahuan language, or to be close to Huichol.

== Vocabulary ==
In 1940, Pedro Hendrichs recorded a short vocabulary of an uncertain language from two travelling musicians, who said they were from Peña Colorada, Zacatecas. The vocabulary bears similarities to Huichol, though the musicians called the language Zacatec and affirmed that it was distinct from Huichol, Cora, Tepehuan and Nahuatl. Howard F. Cline hypothesized that this vocabulary represents a remnant of the Guachichil language or another regional language rather than the language of the historical Zacatec tribe. Wick R. Miller hypothesised that the language recorded could have really been Huichol instead of the Zacatec language, noting that "it seems odd that the language would surface after 400 years, with no reports in between, so far as I am aware".

Vocabulary collected in 1940
gloss	Zacatec
name of the language	zʼapa
body	kuʼāza
nose	ʔzʼuri
mouth	tʼēni
bone	umʼɛ
rabbit	tʼaču
moon	mʼɛȼə
corn	iʔkꞌuʔ
metate	mat́aʔ
tortilla	paʔᵃpʼa
