= Guachichil language =

Extinct language of Mexico

Guachichil
- Cuachichil
- Native to: Mexico
- Region: Zacatecas
- Ethnicity: Guachichil
- Extinct: 17th century
- Revival: 2020s
- Language family: Uto-Aztecan: Southern ?; Corachol ?; Guachichil

Language codes
- ISO 639-3: None (mis)
- Linguist List: 0w6
- Glottolog: None
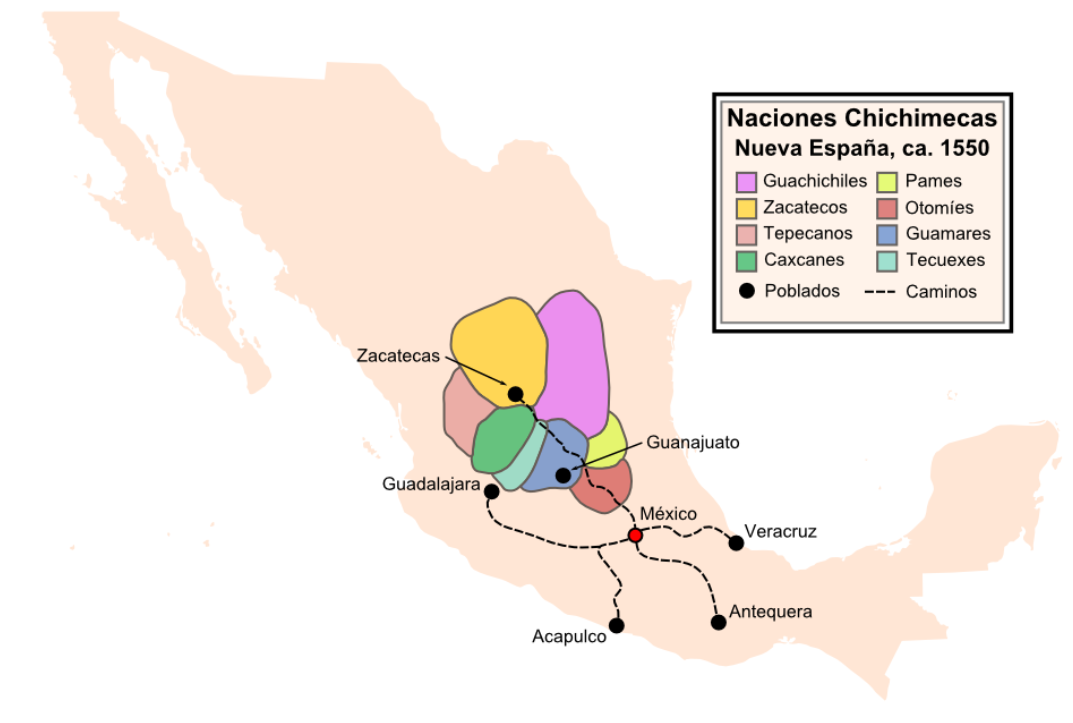
- Guachichil

The Guachichil language is an extinct language formerly spoken in the Mexican state of Zacatecas by the Guachichil. Practically nothing is known about it, with just two words surviving. Wick Miller hypothesized that it was one of the Uto-Aztecan languages, as did Alfred Kroeber, but there is no evidence for this. An affiliation with the "Coahuiltecan languages" has also been proposed. Rosa Herminia Yáñez Rosales suggests that it was closer to other Chichimeca languages, like Zacateco (apparently close or identical with Huichol), Chichimeco Jonaz, and Guamare. According to a Huichol, "Guachichil" was an old name for the Huichols.

The structural and morphological information can only be guessed from proper names and place names. Guachichil was divided into multiple dialects.

As of 2023, the Guachichil Nation, centered in San Luís Potosí, Mexico, (composed of many affiliated Guachichil groups spread across Mexico and the United States) announced ongoing work to revitalize and reconstruct the Guachichil language. A dictionary containing preserved Guachichil words and words added through reconstruction efforts currently exists and is growing.
