= Holy Week in Mexico =

Religious observance in Mexico

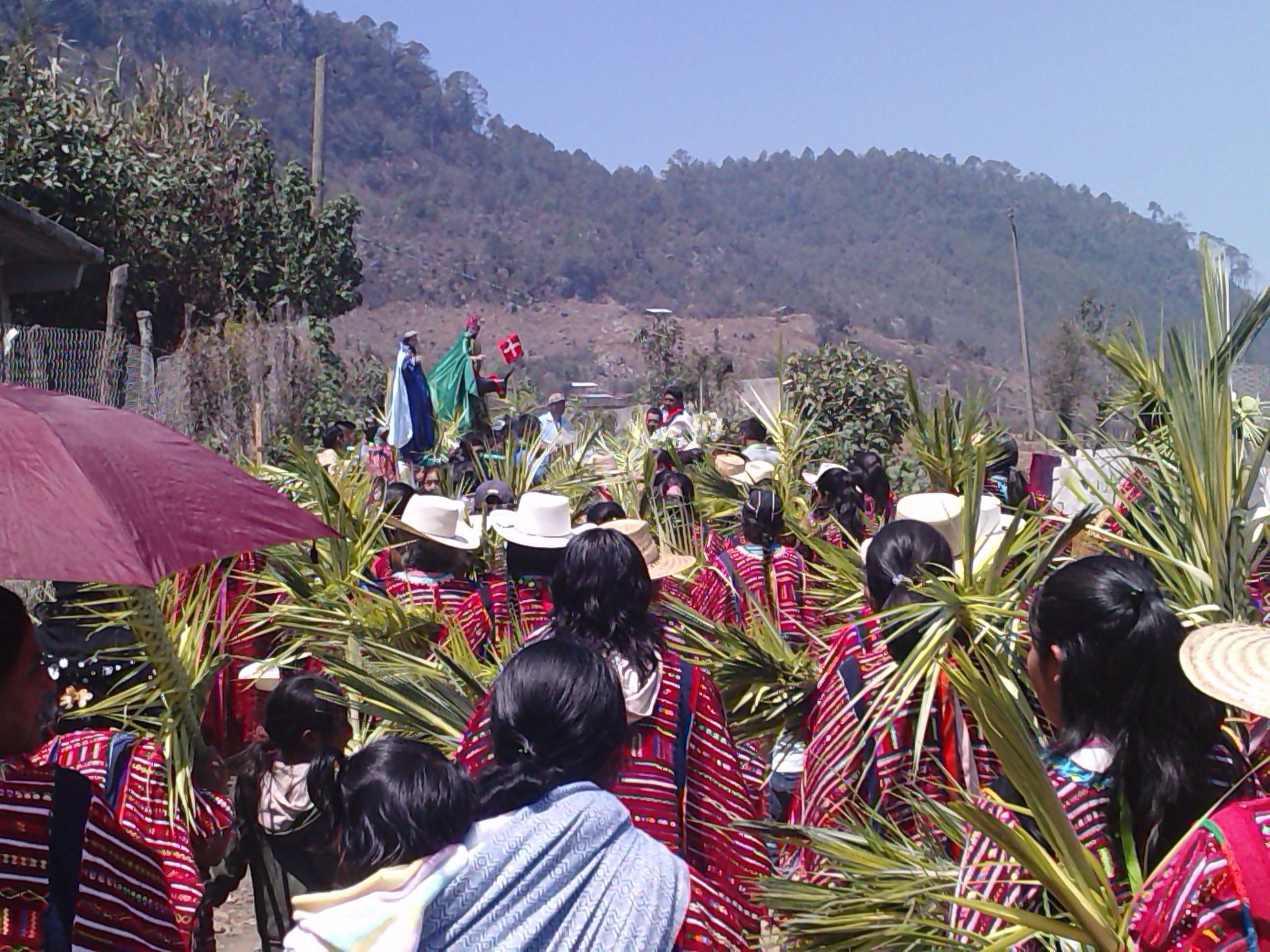
Palm Sunday procession of Trique people in Santo Domingo, Oaxaca

Semana Santa or Holy Week in Mexico is an important religious observance as well as important vacation period. It is preceded by several observances such as Lent and Carnival, as well as an observance of a day dedicated to the Virgin of the Sorrows, as well as a Mass marking the abandonment of Jesus by the disciples. Holy Week proper begins on Palm Sunday, with the palms used on this day often woven into intricate designs. In many places processions, Masses and other observances can happen all week, but are most common on Maundy Thursday, Good Friday, Holy Saturday and Easter Sunday, with just about every community marking the crucifixion of Jesus in some way on Good Friday. Holy Saturday is marked by the Burning of Judas, especially in the center and south of the country, with Easter Sunday usually marked by a Mass as well as the ringing of church bells. Mexico's Holy traditions are mostly based on those from Spain, brought over with the Spanish conquest of the Aztec Empire, but observances have developed variations in different parts of the country due to the evangelization process in the colonial period and indigenous influences. Several locations have notable observances related to Holy Week including Iztapalapa in Mexico City, Taxco, San Miguel de Allende and San Luis Potosí.

== Religious and cultural observance ==
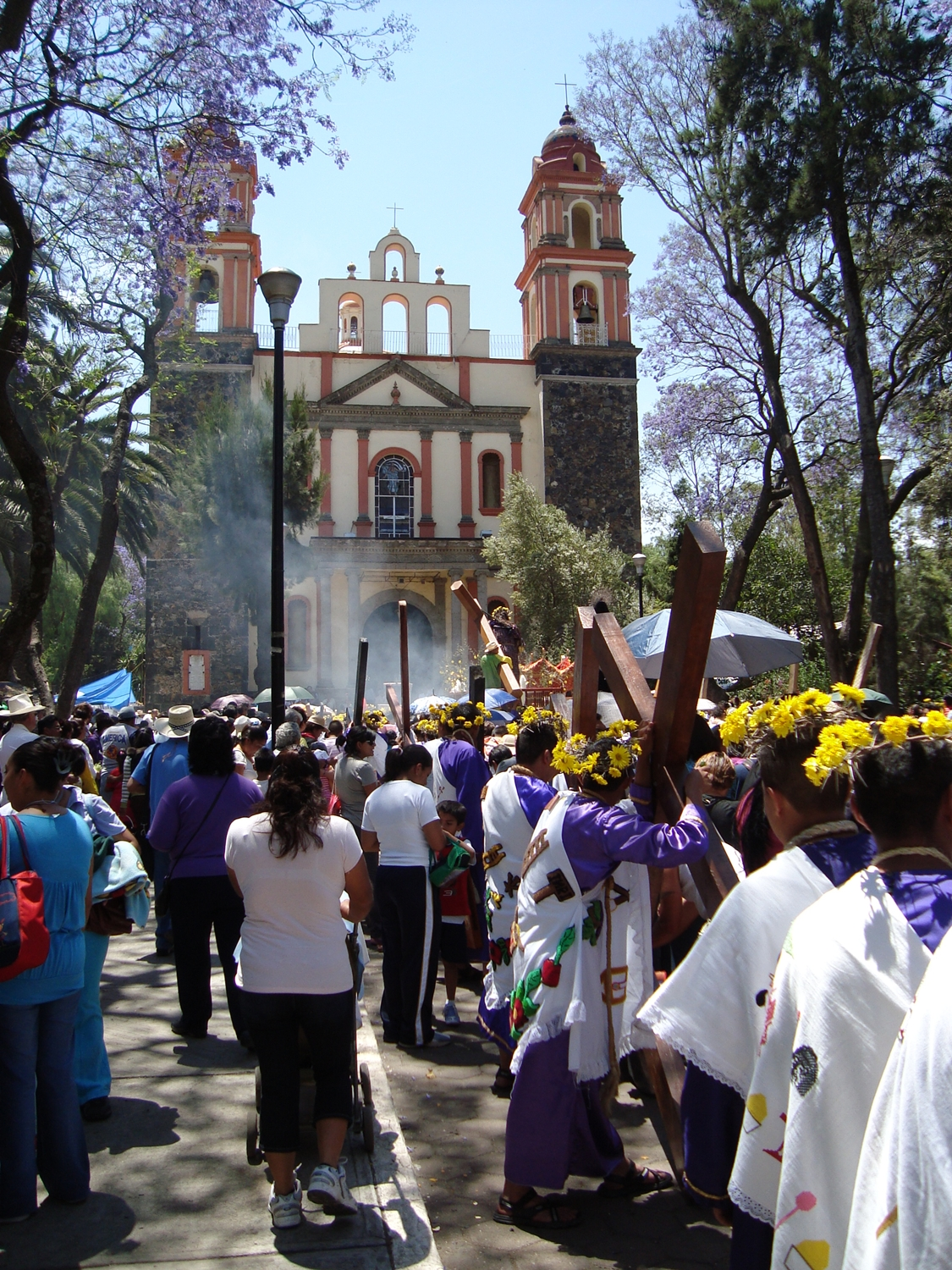
Procession with crosses at the La Cuevita church in Iztapalapa

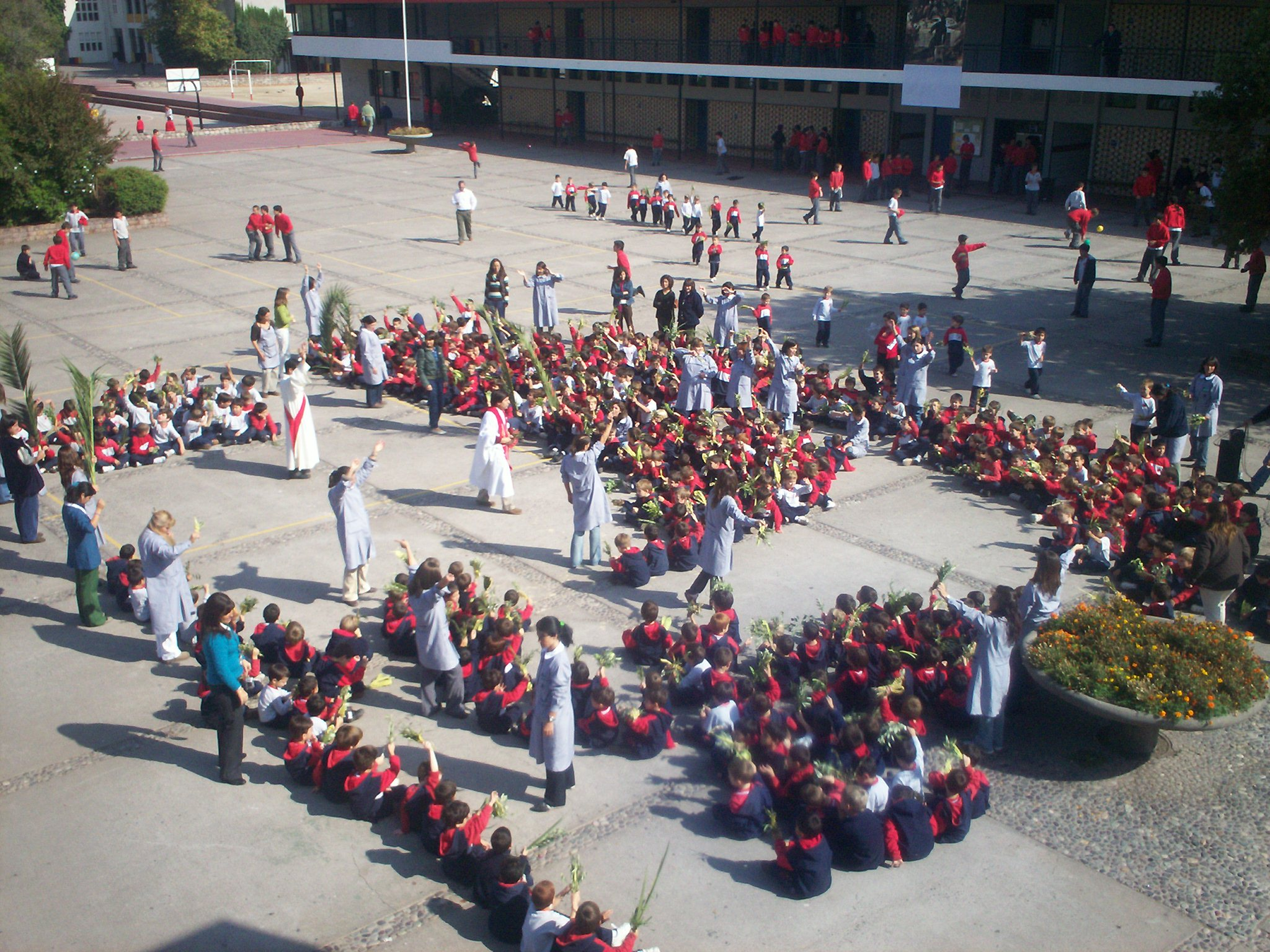
Palm Sunday observance at a school

Holy Week is one of the most widely celebrated and important religious observances in Mexico. Almost all towns and cities in the country have some kind of public observance during a two-week period that starts from Palm Sunday at least to Easter Sunday and can extend into the week after. Mexican television features movies, documentaries and other shows focused on the religious event and other topics related to the Catholic faith, especially in Latin America. The U.S. traditions surrounding Easter have made very little inroads in Mexico, with icons such as the Easter Bunny and events such as Easter egg hunts limited to supermarkets and areas right along the border with the United States. Like most Mexican Catholic traditions, those related to Holy Week and Easter are based on the Spanish Catholic calendar. Holy Week is preceded by Lent and Ash Wednesday, which itself is preceded by Carnival . However, a number of traditions and customs have developed over the centuries. As most events related to Holy Week occur outside and in large gatherings, antojitos (roughly translated as Mexican street food or snacks) is most associated with the holiday. Prior to Easter Sunday, Lenten dietary rules are still in effect for the observant, so popular street foods include pambazos with cheese, fried fish, fried plantains, hot cakes/pancakes with various toppings. Candies are a popular street food at this time, especially traditional and regional ones made from coconut, tamarind and various fruits. Holy Week was also the traditional start of the ice cream and flavored ice season, which was originally made in Mexico City with ice and snow brought down from the Popocatepetl volcano. Ice cream fairs are still held at this time. Today's frozen treats include ice cream in tubs, as well as popsicles made from both fruit and cream, as well as snow cones called “raspados.” Another popular refreshment is called “aguas frescas” or sugared drinks made from fruit or other natural flavorings such as tamarind or hibiscus flowers. The reason for the popularity of both frozen desserts and flavored drinks is that spring to early summer is generally the warmest part of the year in many parts of Mexico.

Just before Holy Week proper, there are two events celebrated in various parts of the country. The first is the feast of the Virgin of Sorrows (Virgen de los Dolores). This occurs the Friday before Good Friday and focuses on the pain and sacrifice of Mary knowing that Jesus had to die to save mankind. This image of the Virgin is usually dressed in purple and altars are set up to her on this day. On the Wednesday before Easter, a Mass called the “vespers of darkness” (los matines de la tinieblas) recalls the disciples’ abandonment of Jesus. The altar of the church will have a candelabra with fifteen candles, with one candle extinguished after the singing of a Psalm until only the center candle, representing Jesus, remains lit.

Holy Week begins on Palm Sunday, and many communities have special Masses dedicated to the blessing of palm fronds. These fronds are often woven into crosses and other designs, sometimes quite intricate and brought by parishioners to have holy water sprinkled on them. Some fronds are later burned and the ashes saved for marking foreheads on the following Ash Wednesday. Maundy Thursday is the beginning of the celebration of Easter proper. Cathedrals in the country have special Masses celebrated by bishops when “chrism”, a sacred oil used in the sacraments, is consecrated. Many churches also hold reenactments of the Last Supper, but Masses usually omit the exchanges of greeting of peace as a reminder of Judas’ betrayal of Jesus. From this day through Holy Saturday, church bells are traditionally not rung.

Reenactments of the day of crucifixion take place in almost all communities in Mexico on Good Friday and for a number these traditions extend to a passion play enacted most or all of Holy Week. The focus of these reenactments is on the carrying of the cross by Jesus and his crucifixion, as told by the Stations of the Cross. In major productions, hundreds of people participate including the entrance of Jesus into Jerusalem, the Last Supper, the Betrayal, the Judgment, the procession with the cross, the Crucifixion up to the Resurrection.

Holy Saturday is dedicated to vigil as the waiting time between Jesus’ death and resurrection. Statues of the Virgin Mary are dressed in black as a symbol of mourning. Frequently there is a solemn evening Mass during which participants hold lighted candles. This is then followed by an event called the Burning of Judas mostly practiced in central and southern Mexico. Originally, it was the burning in effigy of the disciple that betrayed Jesus, a custom introduced to Mexico as part of the evangelization process. During the Mexican Inquisition, effigies were also burnt to mock and protest the burning of people at the stake. These effigies were banned but the idea of protest was transferred to the Judas figures. The Burning of Judas continues in other places but it has been banned in Mexico City because of safety and pollution concerns. The figures are still made in the city but many are now collector's items.

Easter Sunday is celebrated with Mass which is usually crowded. Church bells will again ring and the plazas around the churches after Mass will be crowded with churchgoers as well as street vendors selling food, toys, balloons and more.

== Regional variations in observance ==
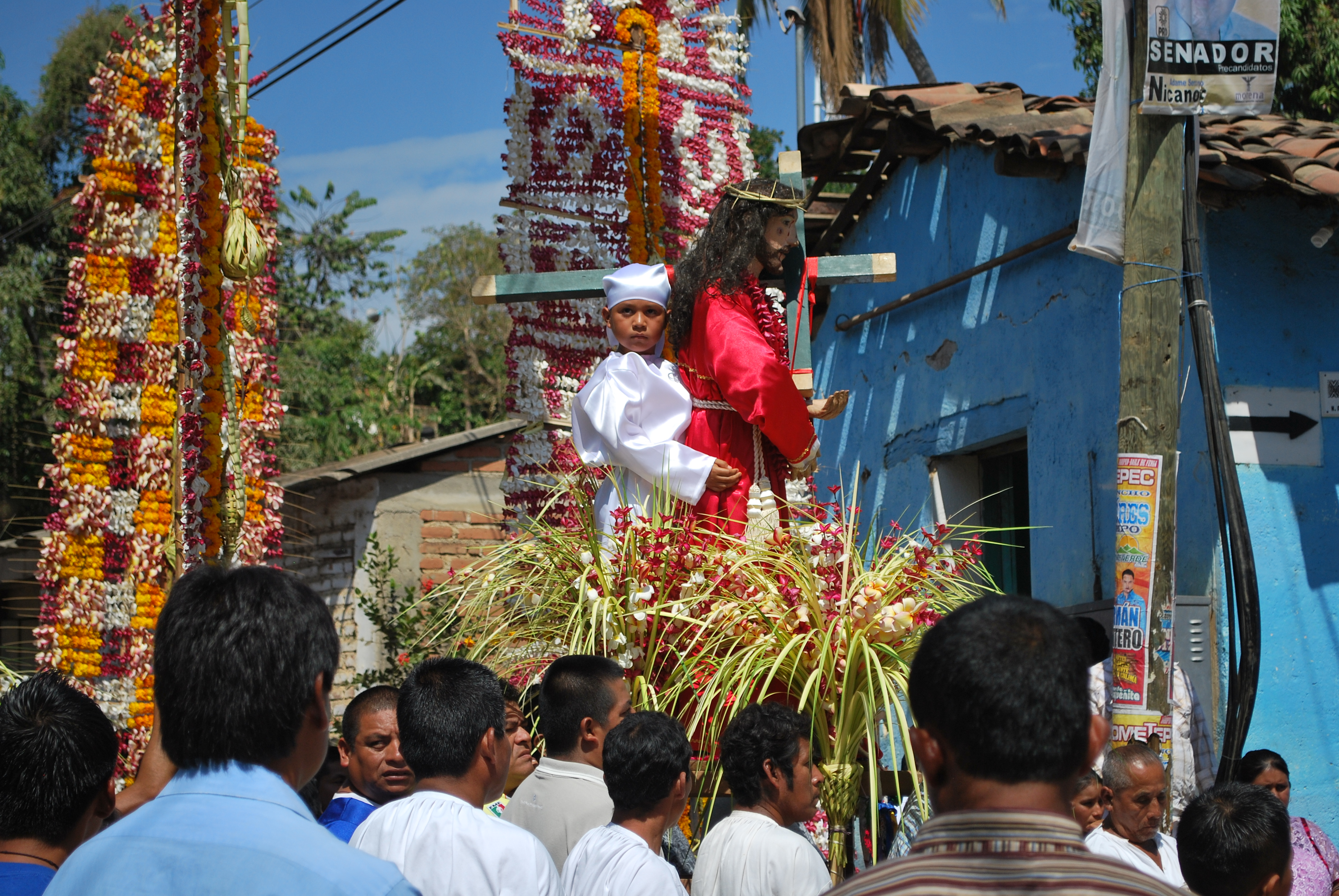
Amuzgo Good Friday procession in Xochistlahuaca.

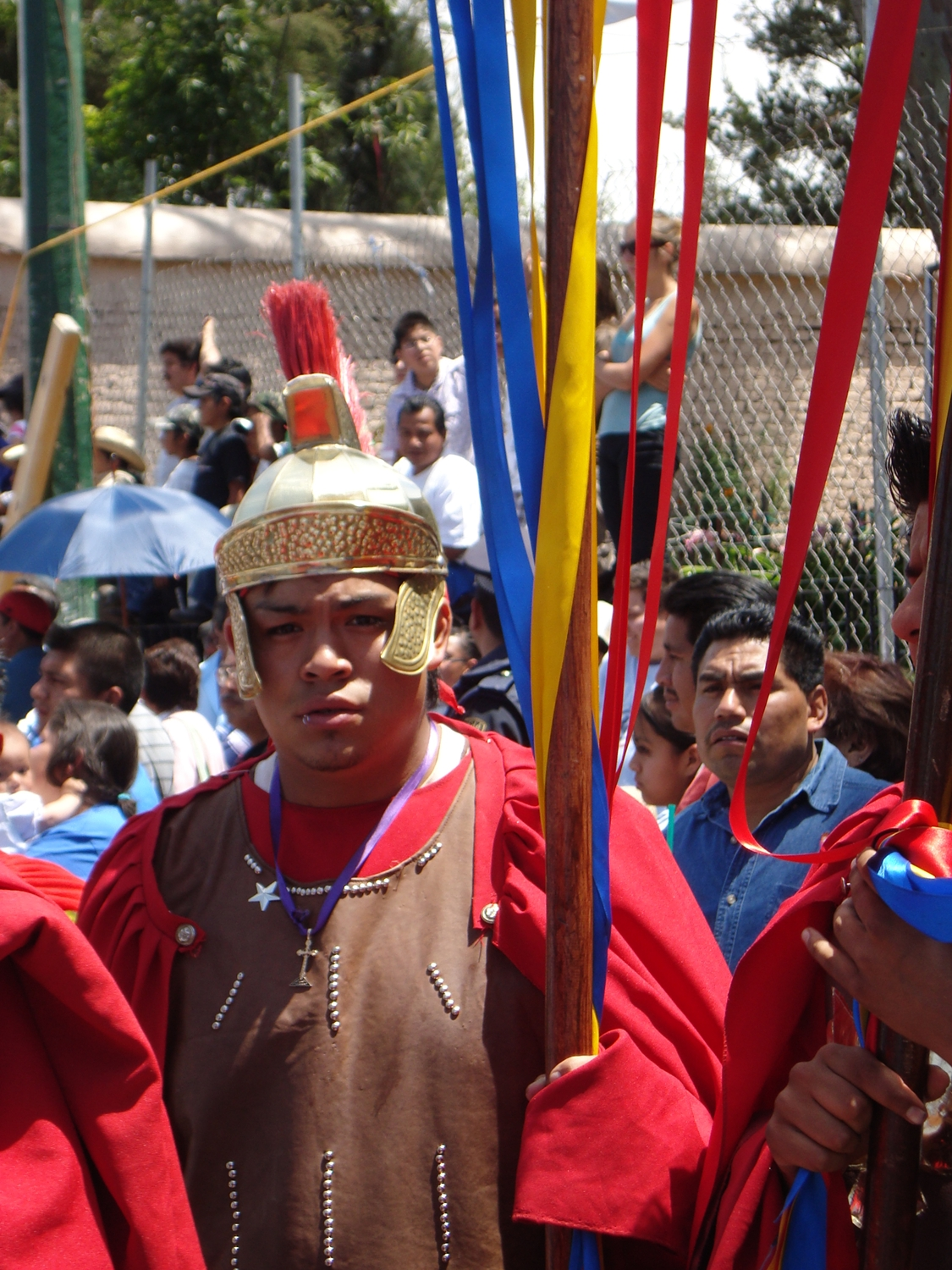
Participant dressed as a Roman soldier for the Iztapalapa passion play

In many areas, processions, Masses and other activities extend for another week. Mexico's Holy Week traditions are based on Spanish ones brought over during the Conquest, along with those created during the evangelization process with some indigenous influence. This has resulted in variations in the celebrations in various regions and towns. A number of these variations have become well known, such as those in Taxco, San Luis Potosí, San Miguel de Allende, Ajijic, and Iztapalapa in Mexico City. Other communities with notable celebrations include Pátzcuaro, Tzintzuntzan, Querétaro, Huajicori, Mesa de Nayar, Creel, Cusarare (Chihuahua), San Ignacio Arareco (Chihuahua), Jerez, Atlixco, Temascalcingo, San Juan Chamula and Zinacantán.

The most famous passion play in Mexico is held in Iztapalapa in the east of Mexico City. This production involves over 4000 local residents (all of whom are born in Iztapalapa) whom perform scenes related to the last week of Jesus's life from Palm Sunday to Good Friday. The production has been done each year since 1843 and today the spectacle attracts over 2 million spectators, mostly Mexican. The play is not a strictly Biblical production as there are a number of characters such as a spy, a dog, a “wandering Jew” and others that are unique to this event. When Christ is captured, Aztec drums and flutes are played. Pontius Pilate sentences Jesus on the town of Iztapalapa's main square then whipped. He then carries a cross from this square to the Cerro de la Estrella on a route over a mile long through eight of the borough's oldest neighborhoods. The most important event is the procession with the cross and the crucifixion scene portrayed on Cerro de la Estrella. Many others called “Nazarenes” follow, carrying their own crosses and wearing real crowns of thorns like Jesus. The play ends with Judas hanging himself after the crucifixion.

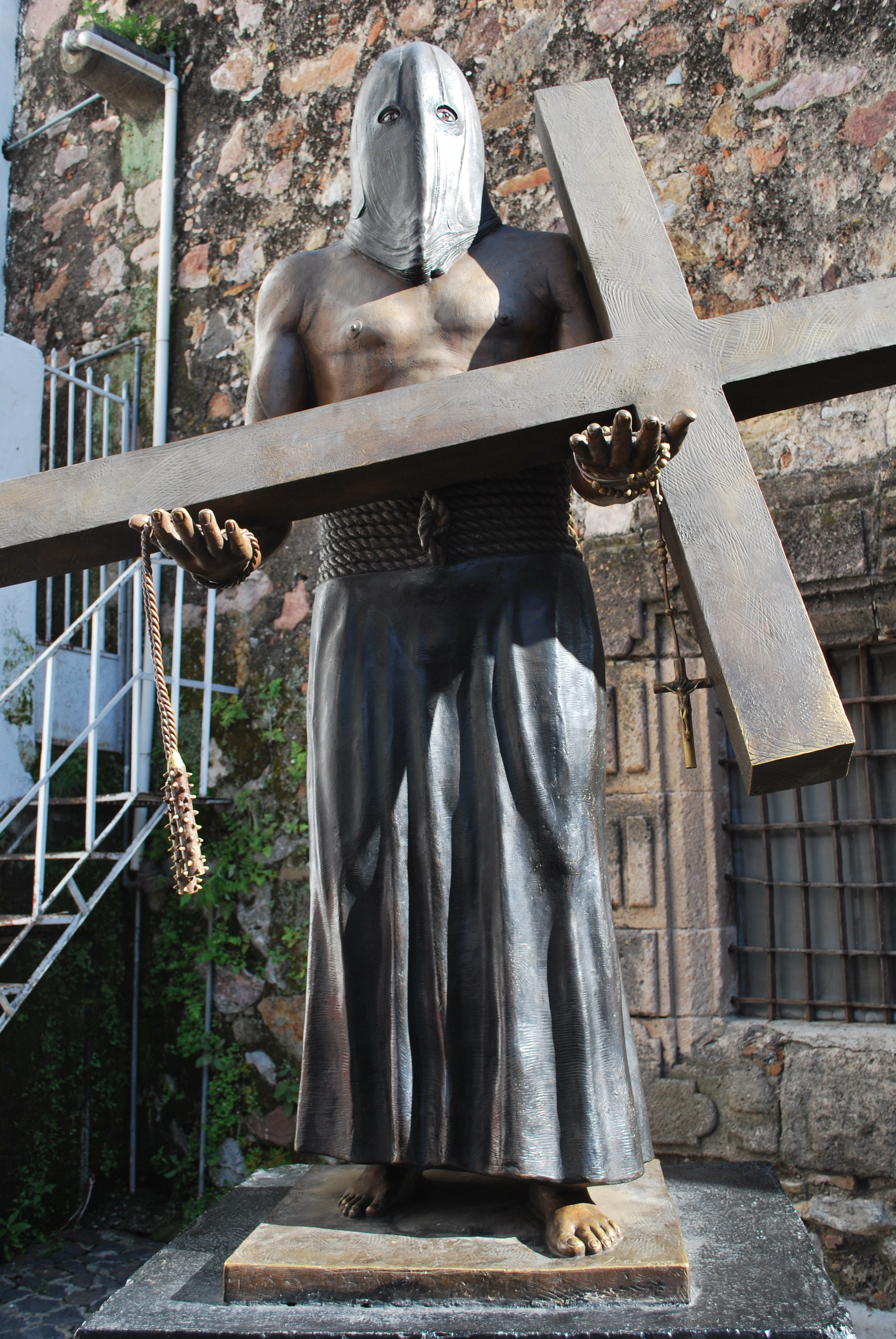
Statue of a Flagelante penitent in Taxco

Another important and unique commemoration of Holy Week occurs in Taxco in the state of Guerrero. It begins on Palm Sunday, with a large wooden statue of Christ traveling on a donkey from the town of Tehuilotepec about four miles to the center of Taxco. The image is preceded in its entrance to Taxco by children on bicycles and residents portraying the Twelve Apostles as well as a drummer. Processions continue all week, led by very young children dressed as angels, immediately followed by older girls dressed in white with white veils, walking barefoot and swinging incense burners containing copal. In these processions, Biblical figures related to the Passion of Christ are represented by wooden statues from the town and surrounding villages, carried on litters, accompanied by musical instruments playing melodies with pre-Hispanic influence. The most notable aspect of these processions are the penitents who inflict pain and suffering on themselves during the processions. While these displays have moderated or disappeared in other parts of Mexico, they remain severe in Taxco. Penitents form into three brotherhoods called the Animas or Bent Ones, the Encruzados (the Crossed) and the Flagelantes (Flagellants). All wear black robes, a horsehair belt and a hood to hide their identity. The Animas walk in procession bent at the waist, never straightening, carrying relics, crosses or candles. This is the only brotherhood that admits women, who are distinguished by lighter chains attached to their ankles. The Encruzados carry a bundle of thorned blackberry canes of up to 100 pounds tied onto their shirtless back and arms with a candle in each hand. The Flagelantes are also bare-backed and carry a large wooden cross in their arms; in their hands are a rosary and a whip with metal points. At appointed places, the penitent hands off the cross, kneels and whips his back. On Maundy Thursday, a scene recreating the Garden of Gethsemane is set up at the Santa Prisca church and on Friday, the statue of Jesus praying is “captured” and “jailed.” On Friday it is “crucified” inside the church with the penitent brotherhoods looking on. A candlelight vigil is on Holy Saturday, ending late in the night with the announcement that Christ has risen. Easter Sunday is quiet.

San Miguel de Allende is noted for its observances of Holy Week, and for two weeks there is at least one procession per day. The focus for much of the pageantry is the “El Señor de la Columna” Christ image, which is brought from the sanctuary of Atotonilco and paraded among the various churches of the area from the Sunday before Palm Sunday to the Wednesday after Easter when it returns to Atotonilco. On Good Friday, this image is carried to the parish church of San Miguel, accompanied by residents dressed as the disciples and Roman soldiers. At noon, images of the Holy Family, the disciples, Mary Magdalene and John the Baptist are also in procession and a passion play is performed. At dark, the images reappear in procession but dressed in black and accompanied by measured drumbeats. During this time, Concheros dancers sporadically appear, especially in the main square of San Miguel. The Burning of Judas occurs on Easter Sunday, not Holy Saturday.

A number of cities and towns hold Processions of Silence, where people march on the street holding candles in silence. The custom comes from the Spanish city of Seville. The most important of these processions is held in the city of San Luis Potosí on Good Friday. It begins at 8 pm at the Plaza del Carmen, with actors dressed as Roman troops playing drums and bugle. This guard then knocks on the door of the Carmen Church. The beginning of the procession leaves the church, carrying crosses and paschal candles. They are joined by more as they move onto the streets, dressed in white robes with cone-shaped hoods with symbols denoting what religious group they belong to. In addition to the robed participants, there are also those dressed as charros, and Adelitas (women of the Mexican Revolution) as well as some in indigenous dress. The focal point of the procession is a large figure of the Virgin of Solitude, the Virgin Mary left alone after the death of Jesus. It and its platform weigh more than a ton and are carried on the shoulders of forty men. The procession continues around the town, punctuated by ritual speeches until midnight, when the last of the robed figures returns to the Carmen Church.

In Tzintzuntzan for most of Holy Week, there are men on horseback, in red hoods and lavender robes, that patrol the area to make sure that stores or craftsmen are doing business as usual. A central activity is processions with penitents led by seven large crosses which have been in the care of seven family for generations. These crosses are then at the front of the parish church on Good Friday as a passion play is performed. Local legend says that as recently as the 1970s, in a nearby village, penitents still had themselves nailed to crosses.

A major pilgrimage site for Holy Week is Chalma, the second most visited pilgrimage site in Mexico after the Basilica of Our Lady of Guadalupe. The focus of the pilgrimage is an image of a black, crucified Christ and the rites here are a mix of Christian and pre-Hispanic influences, such as bathers dipping into a fresh water spring for purification. Dance is a central part of the rites, and an Aztec tradition states that newcomers are obliged to dance for at least one tune.

Other important events for Holy Week include a procession behind a black-faced Christ figure in Patzcuaro, the veneration of a purple-robed paper mache image of Christ at the San Francisco Church in the historic center of Mexico City and that of the Tarahumara in Chihuahua, who paint themselves white for ritual.

== Dates of observance ==
- 2024 - March 24
- 2025 - April 13
- 2026 - March 29
- 2027 - March 21
- 2028 - April 9

== The vacation period ==
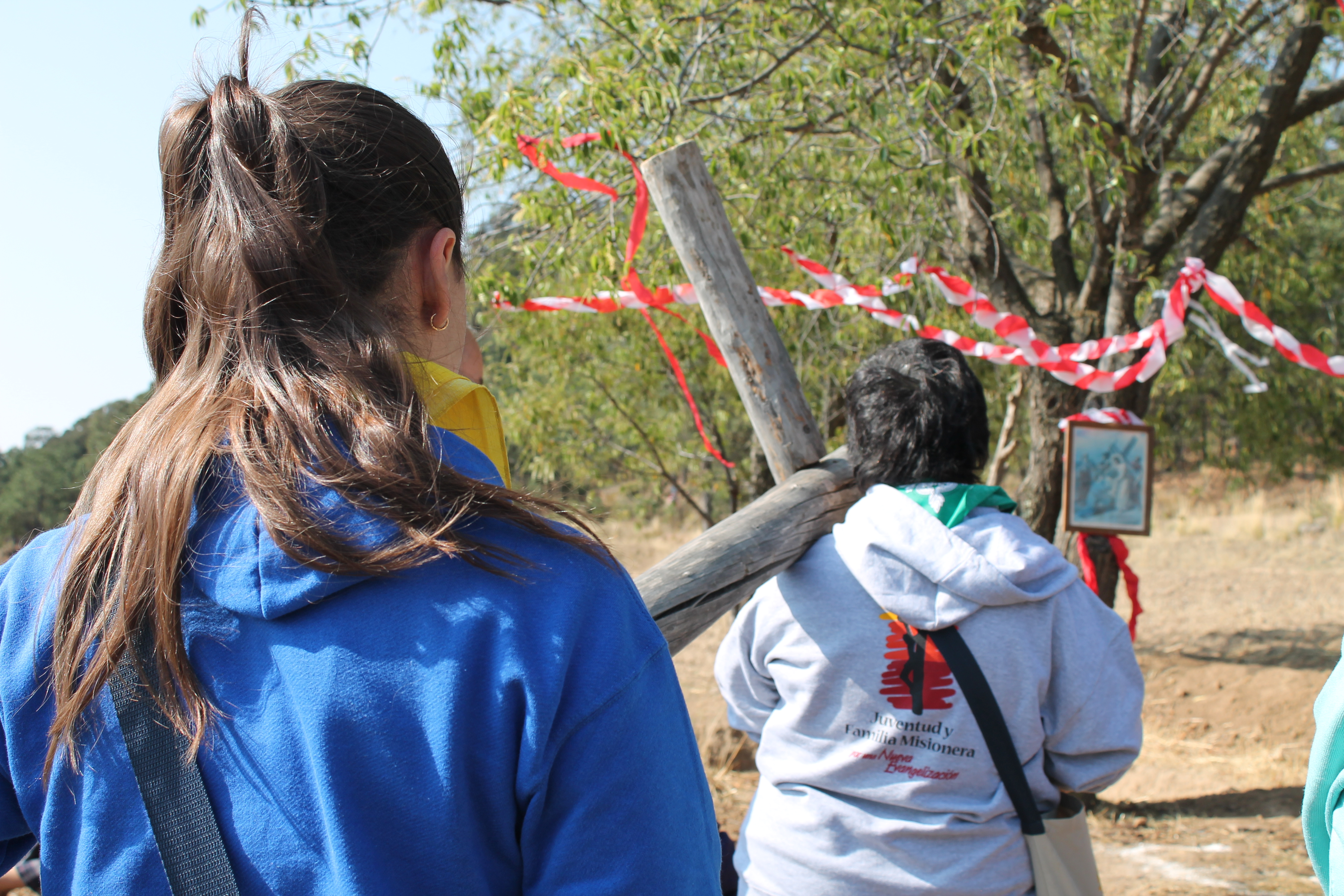
Procession of the Via Crucis that takes place on Good Friday in the community of Las Mesas, in the Roman Catholic Diocese of Tlaxcala

In addition to its importance religiously, it has also become a very important vacation period. Many companies shut down in order to provide time off especially between Palm Sunday to Easter Sunday, with some having the following week off as well. Schoolchildren up through high school generally get two weeks off but university students get only one week. The only class of workers working in full that week are those in the tourism industry. While the original reason for the time off was for religious observance, many skip this aspect at least for part of the time to go on vacation.

Hotels, restaurants and more are crowded, especially at major resorts and other tourist destinations. Airline and other transport prices tend to be higher with terminals crowded at the very beginning and end of the vacation period. Highways will also be heavily used. In 2010 over nine million Mexicans traveled somewhere for the holiday with an economic impact of over ten billion pesos. In 2011 the Mexico City eastern bus terminal, TAPO, served 180,000 people per day during Holy Week, about double its normal volume. However, major metropolitan areas such as Mexico City, Monterrey and Guadalajara tend to be quieter than normal during this week, as many workers in these cities leave for vacation and/or to visit family in the provinces.

The most important vacation spots at this time are beach areas such as Acapulco, Cancún, Puerto Vallarta, Veracruz, Mazatlan, Los Cabos and Huatulco. These vacations are generally taken together as families. Beach towns and other resorts fill with vacationers as well as street vendors and wandering musicians who take advantage of the business opportunity. Occupancy rates climb to over 85% and 100% occupancy is not uncommon, leading to rooms rented in private homes. Those who cannot find accommodations often sleep in their vehicles or even on the beach. Other vacation destinations include colonial cities in the center such as Morelia, Guanajuato, Querétaro, San Miguel de Allende, Taxco, San Luis Potosí and Zacatecas, which receive significant numbers of visitors as well.

Many also cross the border into the United States during this week, especially those who live in the north and/or who have family there to visit. It is also popular to go shopping in the country at this time, making it an important time for some US retailers, especially those near the Mexican border.
