= Cail =

Cail may refer to:

== People ==
- Harry Cail (1913–2008), American sport shooter
- Jean-François Cail (1804–1871), French entrepreneur and industrialist
- William Cail (1849–1925), English rugby pioneer
- Cail MacLean (born 1976), Canadian ice hockey player

== Organizations ==
- Center for American Indian Languages
- Center for American and International Law
