= XEJMN-AM =

SRCI radio station in Jesús María, Nayarit

- Jesús María, Nayarit; Mexico
- Broadcast area: Nayarit, Jalisco, Durango & Zacatecas
- Frequency: 750 kHz
- Branding: La Voz de los Cuatro Pueblos

Programming
- Format: Indigenous community radio

Ownership
- Owner: INPI – SRCI

History
- First air date: 3 April 1992
- Call sign meaning: Jesús María, Nayarit

Technical information
- Licensing authority: CRT
- Class: B
- Power: 10,000 watts daytime only
- Transmitter coordinates: 22°15′15.2″N 104°31′32.2″W

Links
- Webcast: XEJMN-AM
- Website: XEJMN-AM

XEJMN-AM (La Voz de los Cuatro Pueblos – "The Voice of the Four Peoples") is an indigenous community radio station that broadcasts in Spanish, Cora, Huichol, Southeastern Tepehuán and Nahuatl from Jesús María, municipality of El Nayar, in the Mexican state of Nayarit. It is run by the Cultural Indigenist Broadcasting System (SRCI) of the National Institute of Indigenous Peoples (INPI).
