= Passion Play of Iztapalapa =

Annual event in Mexico City

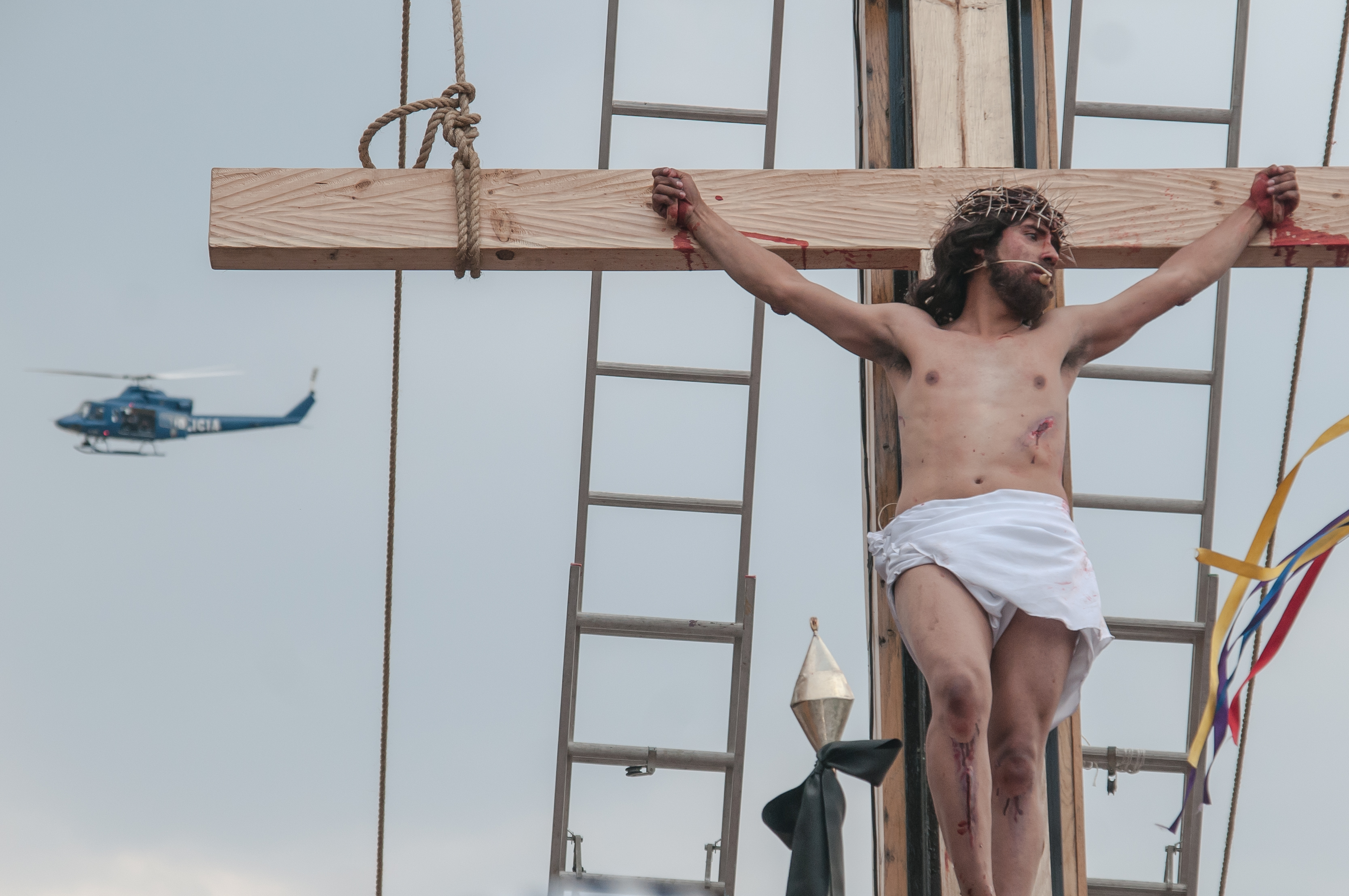
- Date: Holy Week
- Frequency: Annual
- Locations: Iztapalapa, Mexico City, Mexico

Representation of the Passion, Death and Resurrection of Christ in Iztapalapa
- UNESCO Intangible Cultural Heritage
- Country: Mexico
- Reference: 02237
- Region: Latin America and the Caribbean

Inscription history
- Inscription: 2025 (20th session)
- List: Representative

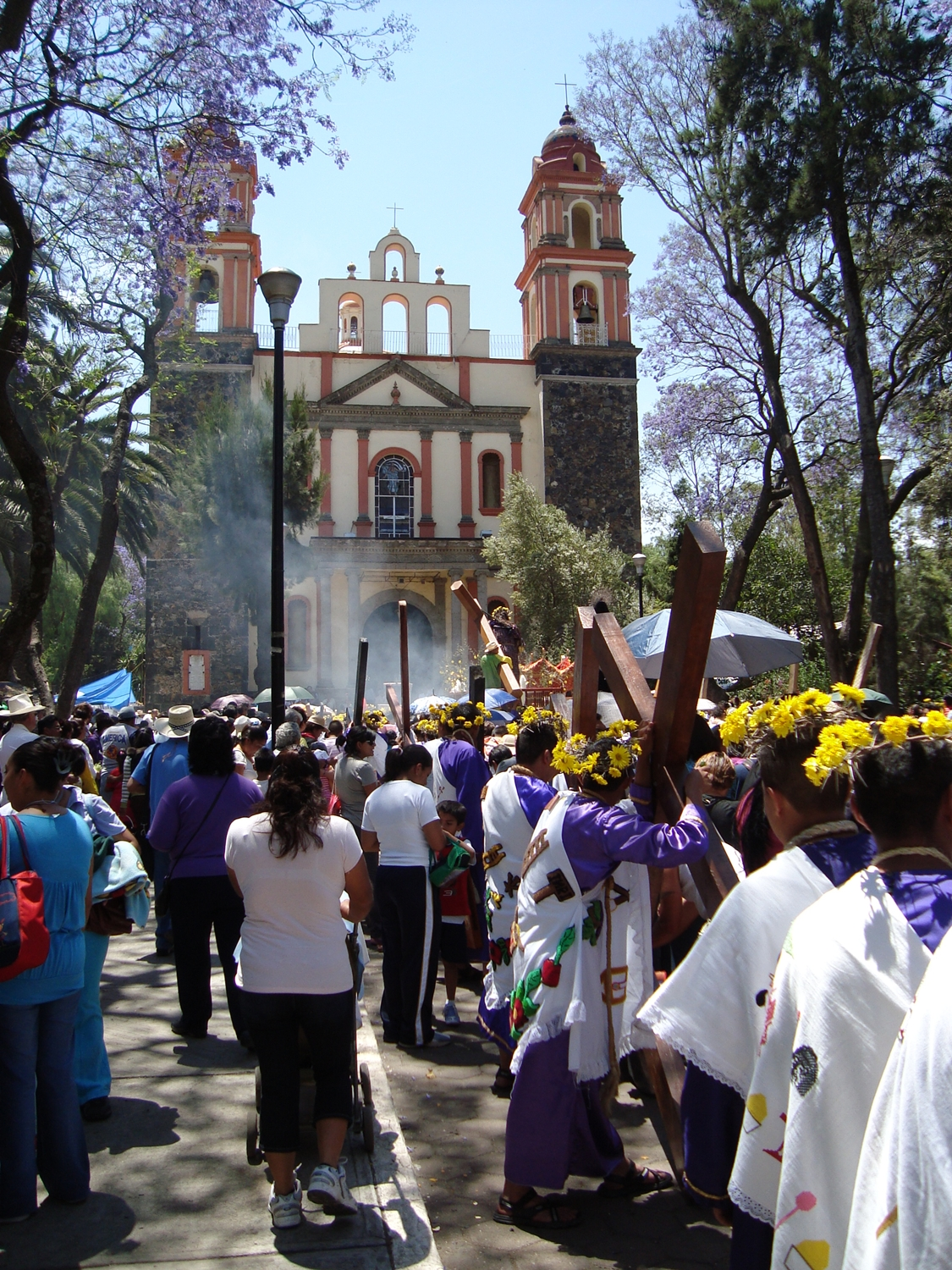
A Good Friday Procession to the "Cuevita" during Holy Week in Iztapalapa

The Passion Play of Iztapalapa is an annual event during Holy Week in the Iztapalapa borough of Mexico City. It one of the oldest and most elaborate passion plays in Mexico as well as the best known, covered by media both in Mexico and abroad. Unlike others in Latin America, its origins are not in the colonial period but rather in a cholera epidemic in the 19th century, which gave rise to a procession to petition relief. Over time, the procession included a passion play which grew to include various scenes related to Holy Week. Today, the play includes not only hundreds of actors but also thousands of men called “Nazarenes” who carry their own crosses to follow the actor chosen to play Jesus to the site where the crucifixion is reenacted. While the event is still primarily religious, it has also become a rite of identity for Iztapalapa (only residents of certain communities may participate) as well as a major tourism attraction for both the borough and the city.

== Description of event ==
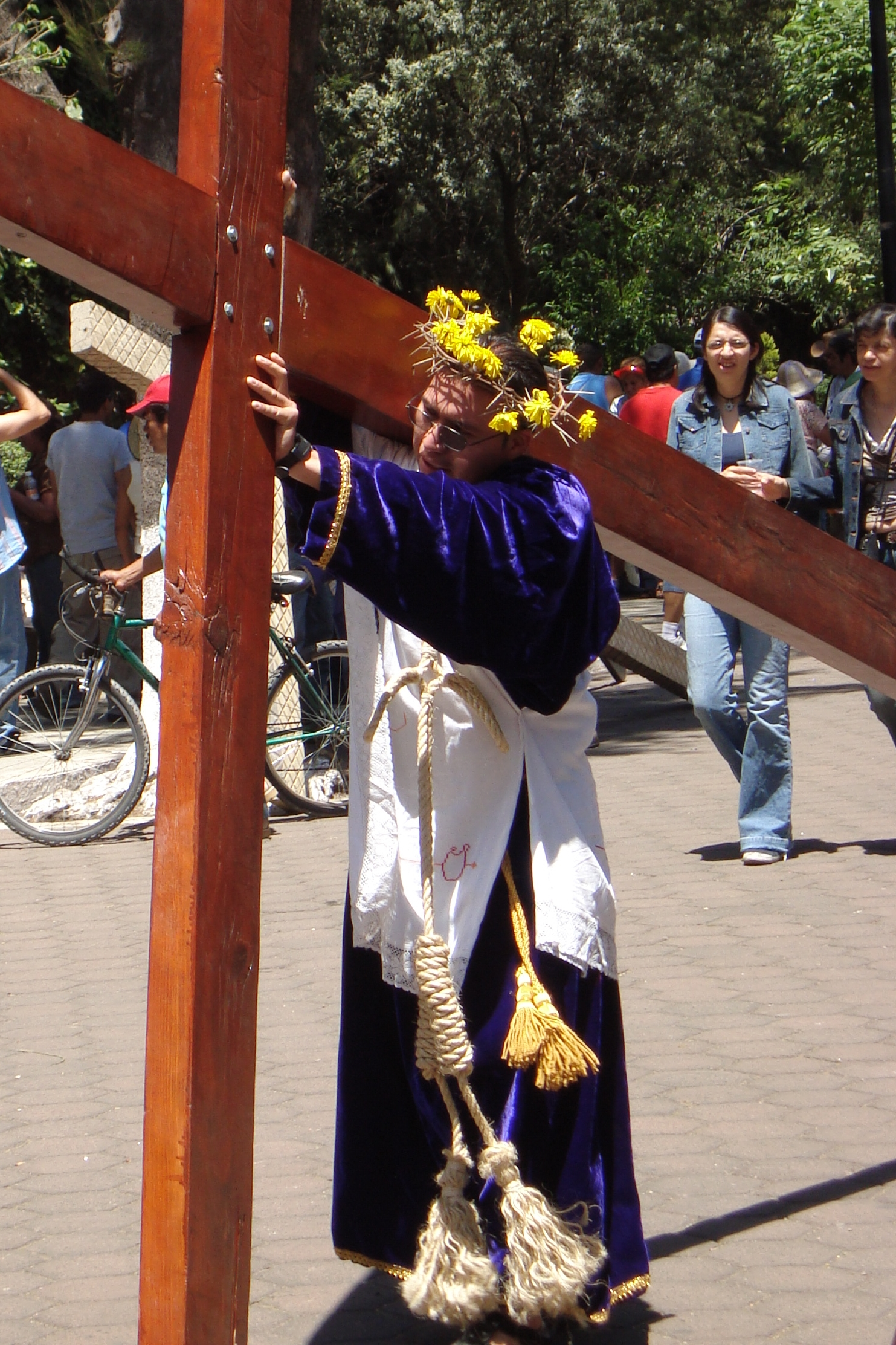
A "Nazarne" carrying cross during Holy Week in Iztapalapa

In Mexico, many communities stage processions and passion plays for Good Friday, which in some places extends into other days of Holy Week. The Mexico City borough of Iztapalapa holds the largest and most elaborate of these, with up to 5,000 people participating and 150 of these with speaking roles. While a religious event principally, it is also a community event, as only residents of the eight original communities of the borough (San Lucas, Santa Bárbara, San Ignacio, San Pablo, San José, San Pedro, La Asunción and San Miguel) can participate. The event is popular, drawing crowds of anywhere from 2.5 million to four million from Mexico and abroad during the week that scenes are performed. The play is also accompanied by news media helicopters and rows of police to keep control of the crowds.

The performances do not adhere strictly to the Bible as there are influences from other religious writings and even secular stories. While it is claimed that the original script for the play still exists, its performance has evolved over the years. Unique features to the Iztapalapa event include a character called the “Wandering Jew”, a harem belonging to King Herod, and a spy and dog that accompany Judas Iscariot who personally brings Jesus to Pontius Pilate. Costumes are elaborate. The Roman soldiers wear leather sandals, bright tunics, plumed helmets, and carry javelins and swords. A number of these ride horses lent by the Mexico City police who train them to ride.

The performances begin on Palm Sunday with a procession along Calle Aztecas to the local parish church, where Mass is held. Then the recreation of Jesus's entry into Jerusalem is held. On Holy Tuesday, a scene depicting the miracle of the loaves and fishes is held. Crowds grow for Maundy Thursday at the Cuitlahuac Plaza, which begins with a procession that finishes with the reenactment of the Last Supper, the washing of Jesus’ feet, and Judas’ betrayal. When Jesus is arrested, Aztec drums and flutes announce the event. There is also a Procession of Silence which winds its way through the eight communities.

The play is intense and emotional, especially on Good Friday. The scene of Jesus being tried by Pontius Pilate occurs at midday at the Cuitlahuac Plaza. He is then turned over to the Pharisees. After this, about 10,000 join the cast and crew in the procession to Calvary, carrying crosses of different sizes. This procession is an enactment of the Stations of the Cross. Jesus is kicked, beaten, and whipped, and cinematic blood used. When he stumbles and falls, the crowds react. Judas walks through the streets and the crowd calls out “traitor”, as the actor throws fake coins from a bag. At the top of the Cerro de la Estrella, which doubles as Mount Calvary, the sound of nails being hammered comes across the loudspeakers, and the crowd becomes very quiet. The actor is really bound to the cross and remains there for about twenty minutes. As the cross with Jesus is lifted it is not unusual to see people crying. After the crucifixion, the representation ends with Judas hanging himself alongside Jesus followed by a Procession of the Holy Burial ending in the plaza.

The finale is on Black Saturday, wherein the Resurrection and Ascension scenes in the plaza constitute the final scenes of the play, with the final curtain call and fireworks providing the climax.

In addition to the man and women chosen to play Jesus and Mary, hundreds of young men called Nazarenes follow in the procession to the Cerro de la Estrella, barefoot, with crosses of varying sizes and often with crowns of thorns. They are accompanied by “Vírgenes de Pueblo” (Town Virgins) .

The annual passion play has become an important tourist attraction for Mexico City, especially for the borough of Iztapalapa, which promotes tourism to the area during this time, offering guided tours of local museums, landmarks and green spaces. There are also specials in local hotels and restaurants. Around the staging areas, there is a carnival atmosphere with street vendors, amusement rides, and those selling religious items. Many of the scenes take place on the esplanade in front of borough hall. In 1992 the city published a book about it called Semana Santa en Iztapalapa (Holy Week in Iztapalapa). In 2009 a cultural festival called the Festival Cultural Pasión por Iztapalapa was created to run alongside the religious event. In the same year, two monumental sawdust carpets were created related to the event for a photographic exhibition on the plaza in front of borough hall. However, due to the solemnity of the occasion, the sale of alcohol in all venues, including bars, restaurants, and nightclubs is banned for the entire week.

== Preparations ==
The production of the event is a massive undertaking. It requires the coordination of people from the eight original communities (barrios) of the borough, which amount to thousands of people who devote months rehearsing, creating costumes and sets, and then decorating churches and streets and more. A number of the tasks as well as certain roles have been passed down for generations, such as providing first aid, creating the cloth Veronica uses to wipe Jesus’ face, and certain acting roles – although this has been challenged as more people want to participate. There are 136 principal actors that rehearse for 37 days, along with another 275 actors, 500 extras, and about 2,000 Nazarenes that follow the actor playing Jesus when he carried the cross to his crucifixion. In addition, there is coordination with borough and city authorities who provide logistics in terms of thousands of police for crowd control, as well as ambulances, doctors, helicopters and water stations. Direct costs run in the hundreds of thousands of pesos, with millions more in city services. All of this is coordinated by a committee of Iztapalapa residents, called the Comité Organizador de la Semana Santa en Iztapalapa. It has over fifty members and its organization is partially based on indigenous traditions.

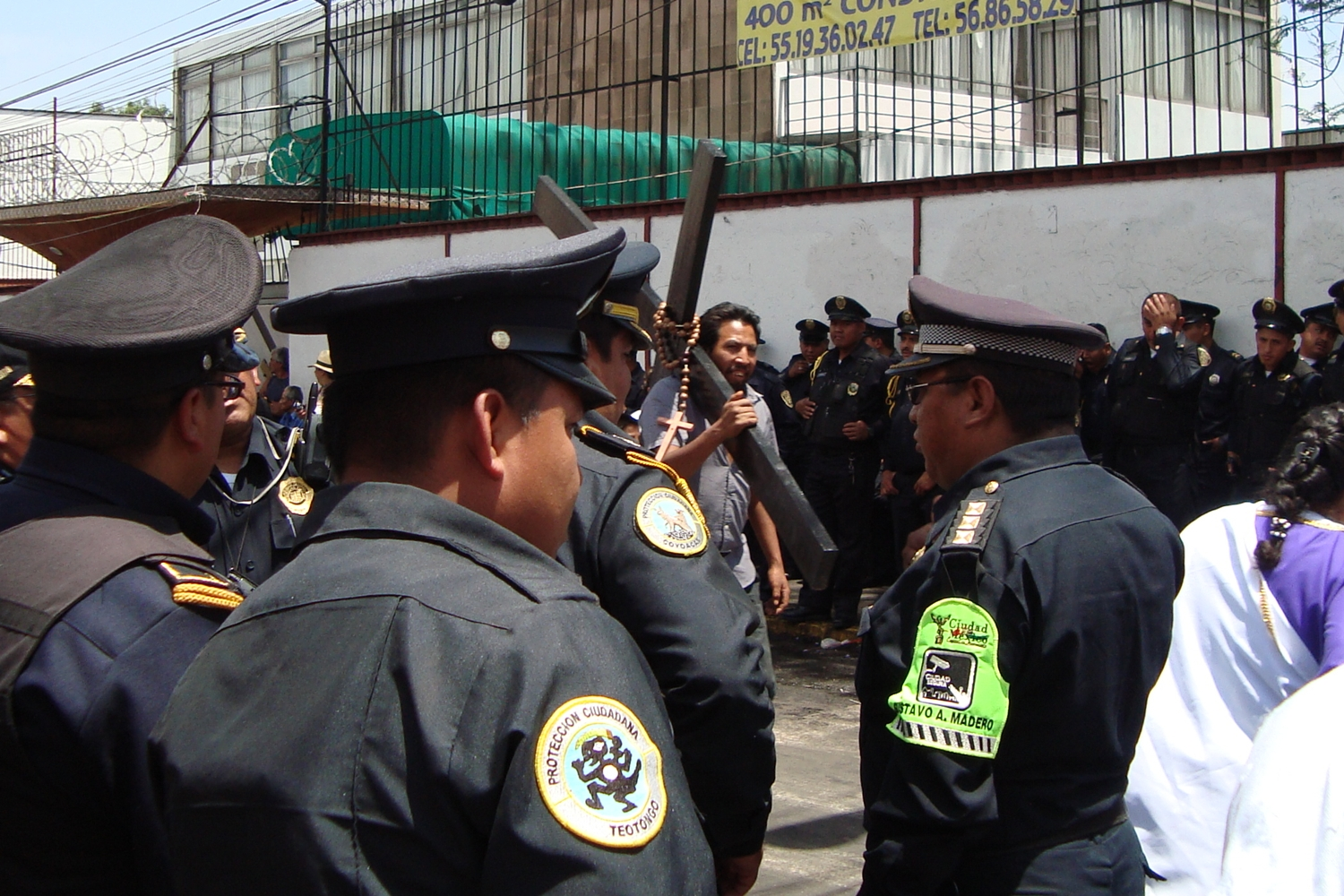
Police line streets for the Good Friday procession to Cerro de la Estrella

Another important role for the committee is to select the people to play the most important roles, especially the man and woman to play Jesus and Mary respectively. Tradition demands that those chosen to play these two roles may not date, drink, smoke or go to parties until they have finished their commitments, along with two newer traditions: no tattoos or piercings. The candidates must also show that they have the economic means to buy the costumes. The candidates are investigated to ensure they meet these requirements. In addition, candidates to play Jesus must also show that they have the physical endurance for the beatings and for carrying of a 100 kilo (220 lb.) cross for four kilometers. Once the chosen candidate passes the two rounds of the selection process, he is then required to remain celibate for the intervening year before the performance, and begin physical training six months in advance.

== History ==
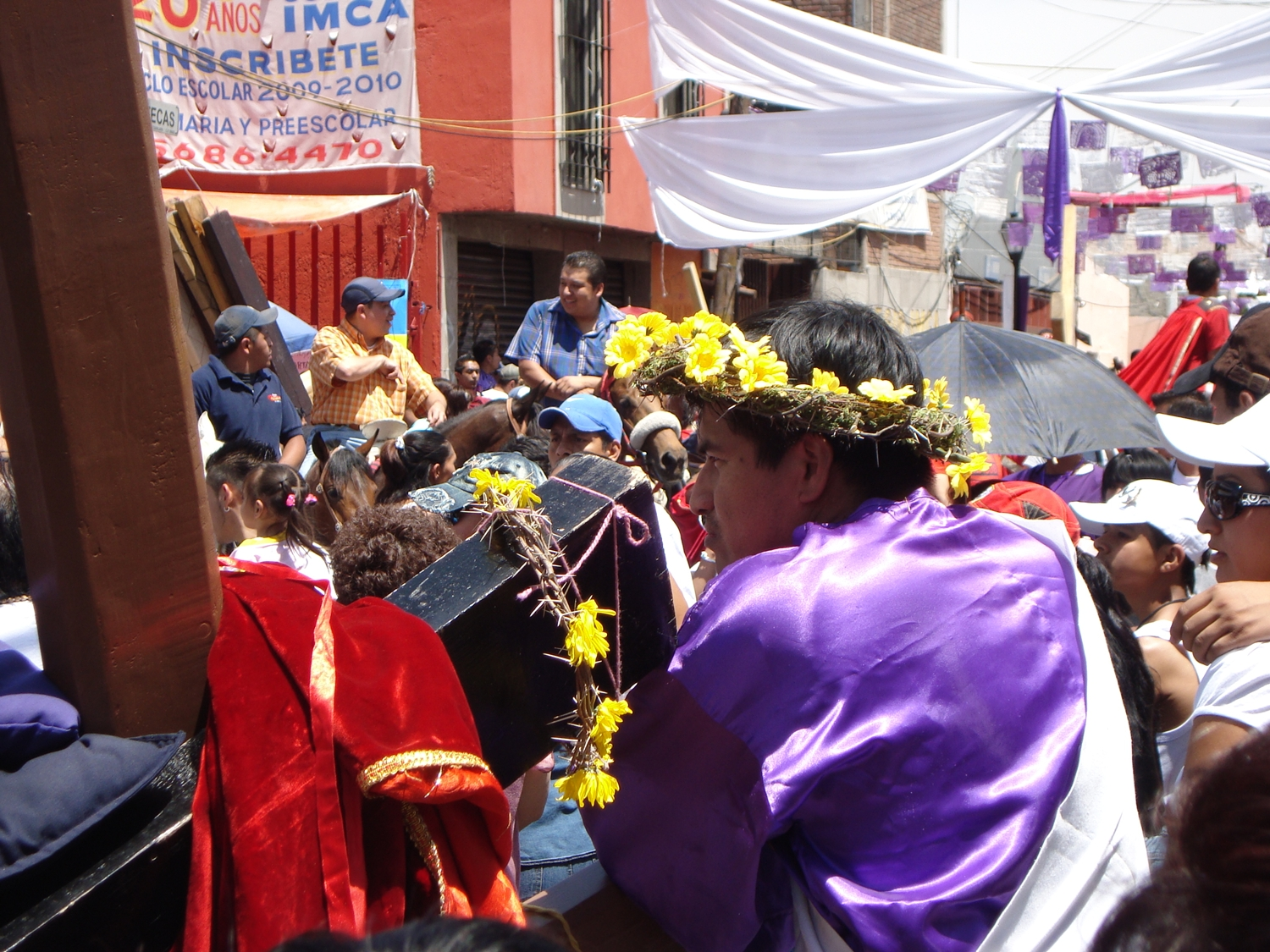
A "Nazarene" resting during the procession

The event is one of the most elaborate and oldest of its kind in Mexico. However, unlike most passion plays in Latin America, this does not date from the colonial period. Its origins are in a cholera epidemic in 1843 when the Iztapalapa area, outside of Mexico City proper, had a population of about 20,000, mostly indigenous. As a petition to ease the pestilence, the area began a procession to the “Señor de la Cuevita” ( Lord of the Small Cave), an image of Christ entering Jerusalem on a donkey which is found in a small natural cave in the community of Pueblo Culhuacán. When the epidemic ended it was seen as a miracle and it became a permanent annual event. Soon after, the procession included a reenactment of the crucifixion on Good Friday, and over time the passion play grew to cover almost all of the events associated with Holy Week. Although its origins are in the 19th century, there is evidence of syncretism with indigenous traditions. The procession changed from the image in the cave to Cerro de la Estrella in 1920, after a heavy rain inundated the original site. This site was that of the Pyramid of Mixcoatl, associated with the New Fire ceremony. Aztec drums and flutes appear in the event as well.

Catholic authorities have alternatively banned and approved the event since its inception. There is a letter dated 1867 asking Benito Juárez for help in its preservation against hostile church authorities. During the Mexican Revolution, the event was suspended due to clashes between governmental and church authorities. However a legend states that Emiliano Zapata lent his horses and ordered the renewal of the event in 1914. Church criticisms of the play have included that it deviates too much from the Biblical account, and it does have elements of other stories such as Dante's Divine Comedy. Examples of deviation include King Herod's harem which performs a sensual belly dance. However, the play has survived not only church prosecution but also governmental opposition to public displays of religion and Iztapalapa's demographic change from indigenous to mestizo.

The popularity of the performance began to significantly increase after World War II, attracting tourists first from within Mexico then from abroad. Popularity increased in the 1960s, when Vatican II legitimated passion reenactments. It has become the most famous passion play in Mexico. Television coverage of the event began in the 1980s, and since has regularly been broadcast to the Spanish-speaking world, as well as covered by media in the United States and Europe. While it remains first and foremost a religious event, it has also become a rite of local identity and has brought attention to the poverty of the borough. A documentary about the event called "Iztapalapa, memoria y tradición" was directed by Francisco Alatriste Torres of the Escuela Nacional de Antropología e Historia. The city government has declared the event to be an intangible cultural heritage of Mexico City, as part of an effort to gaining similar recognition from UNESCO. The increased tourism, as well as “competition” and influence from other passion plays, have had an effect. The urban space where the play takes place has changed to accommodate its growth. Passion plays in the Philippines have had an influence leading to more realism in the violence, both in the flogging and the crucifixion. The actors have become younger, as well as the Nazarenes which now include some children.

=== Passion Play 2020 ===
Due to the COVID-19 pandemic in Mexico, the play was moved indoors for the first time in its 177-year history and it was broadcast on television. Fairs, commercial events, pilgrimages, and shows associated with Holy Week in Mexico were suspended. Schools were closed and vacationers were advised to stay away from beaches and other tourist attractions. The broadcasts, the first to be aired nationwide on television, were co-produced by the borough government and public stations Channel 14 and Channel 11, as well as the city-owned Capital 21 (with broadcasts online to viewers abroad as before, but with the added first of international broadcasts via satellite).

In 2021, the number of broadcasters of the event grew, with even Televisa's YouTube page offering a live broadcast feed.

The in-person play returned for the 2022 season. For 2025, the official YouTube channel finally added a simultaneous sign language interpretation inset for the deaf and hard of hearing who watch the broadcast.

In 2025, the Passion Play was granted the status of UNESCO Intangible Cultural Heritage in recognition of more than a century of performances and their impact in both Mexico City and nationwide. The public declaration ceremony was held on February 18, 2026, which also served as an early official kickoff to the Holy Week 2026 season.
