= Huaynamota =

Ethnic group in Mexico

The Huaynamota Indians are an indigenous group primarily associated with the rugged Sierra Madre Occidental region in western Mexico, particularly in the southern part of the state of Nayarit and adjacent areas of Durango and Zacatecas. The name Huaynamota refers to a river and valley that traverses this mountainous territory, historically serving as a cultural and geographic axis for various indigenous communities, including the Huichol (Wixárika), Cora (Náayeri), and Tepehuán peoples.

The Huaynamota communities have a cultural identity based on traditional agriculture, spiritual practices, and communal governance. The area is particularly remote and marginalized, which has led to the preservation of indigenous customs, languages, and rituals. The local economy consists in subsistence farming, particularly of maize, beans, and squash and alongside livestock farming. They have received the support of government programs in recent times.

Religious life in the region is characterized by a syncretism of Catholicism and indigenous belief systems. Ceremonial centers and sacred sites are located throughout the Huaynamota area, where rituals associated with rain, fertility, and cosmological balance are performed.

Many villages still speak indigenous languages, such as Huichol and Cora, but Spanish has become more prevalent due to increased contact with the broader Mexican society. In 1580 the Franciscans founded a mission in Hueymanota, the first and only in the Great Nayar area, but the Indians left to resettle far from the mission.

Historically, the region has been marginal to the Mexican state, leading to limited infrastructure and access to services. However, development projects and road construction in recent decades have increased outside influence, which have sparked debates about cultural preservation versus integration. Modern Huaynamota communities continue to advocate for autonomy, land rights, and cultural recognition in Mexico.
