= Procession of Silence in San Luis Potosi =

Annual Holy Week procession in Mexico

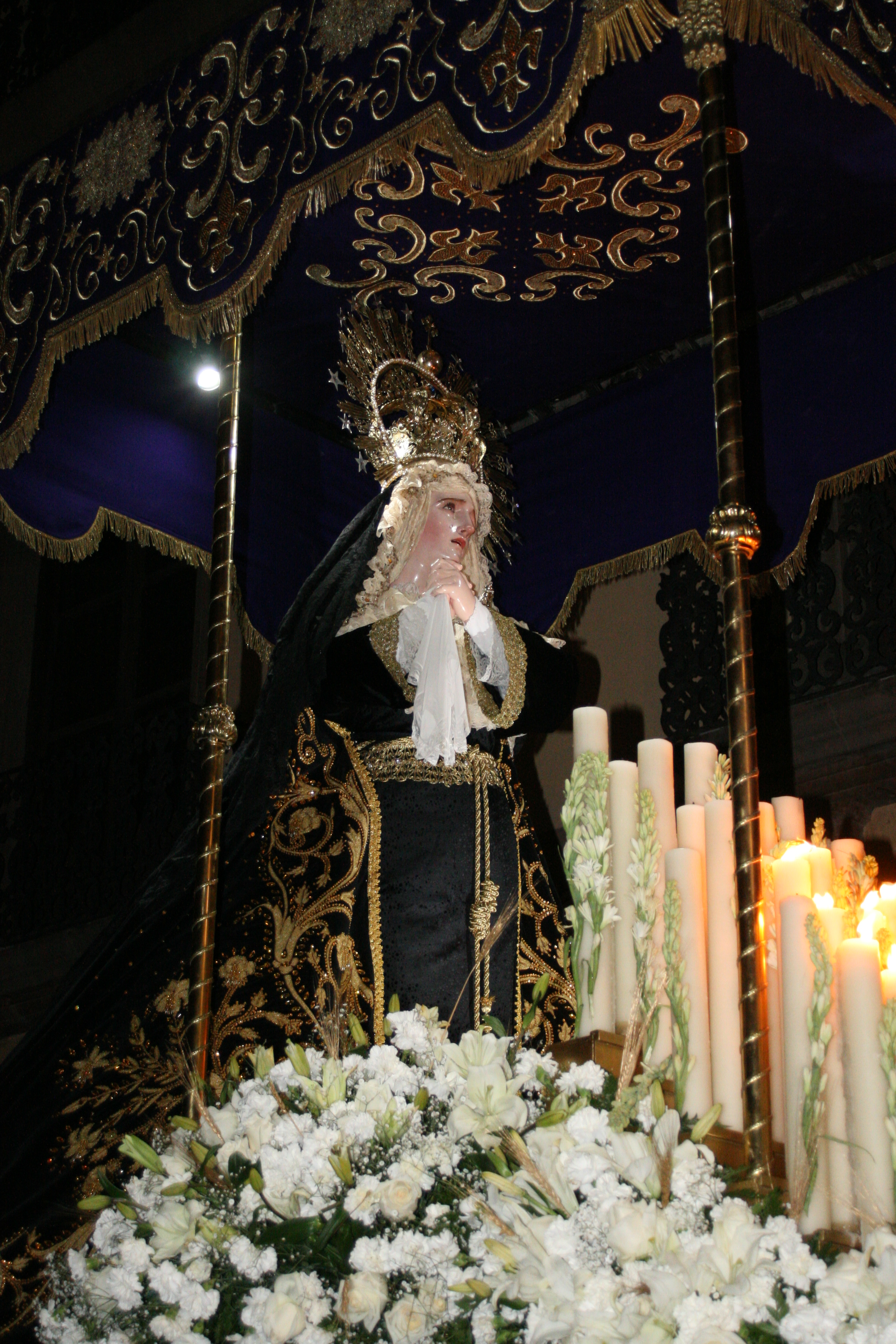
Image of Our Lady of Solitude at the procession

The Procession of Silence in San Luis Potosi is an annual event to mourn the Passion of Christ and honor Our Lady of Solitude. It occurs on the night of Good Friday, beginning at the El Carmen Church, where it originated, and winds through the streets of the historic center of the city of San Luis Potosí. During the event there are the sounds of drums and bugles, but no participant or spectator speaks, giving the event its name. It is one of the most important Holy Week observances in Mexico and was declared part of the cultural heritage of the state of San Luis Potosí in 2013.

== Significance ==
Organized by the Tradiciones Potosinas association, the procession commemorates as an act of mourning the Passion of Christ. It is a reenactment of the Stations of the Cross, with each station marked by a heavy platform with the relevant images. This procession is one of the most important Holy Week observances in Mexico, one of the most important religious events for the state of San Luis Potosí and emblematic for the city. It is also a major tourist event, attractive over 160,000 visitors to the city, with about fifteen percent coming from outside of Mexico.

== The main event ==
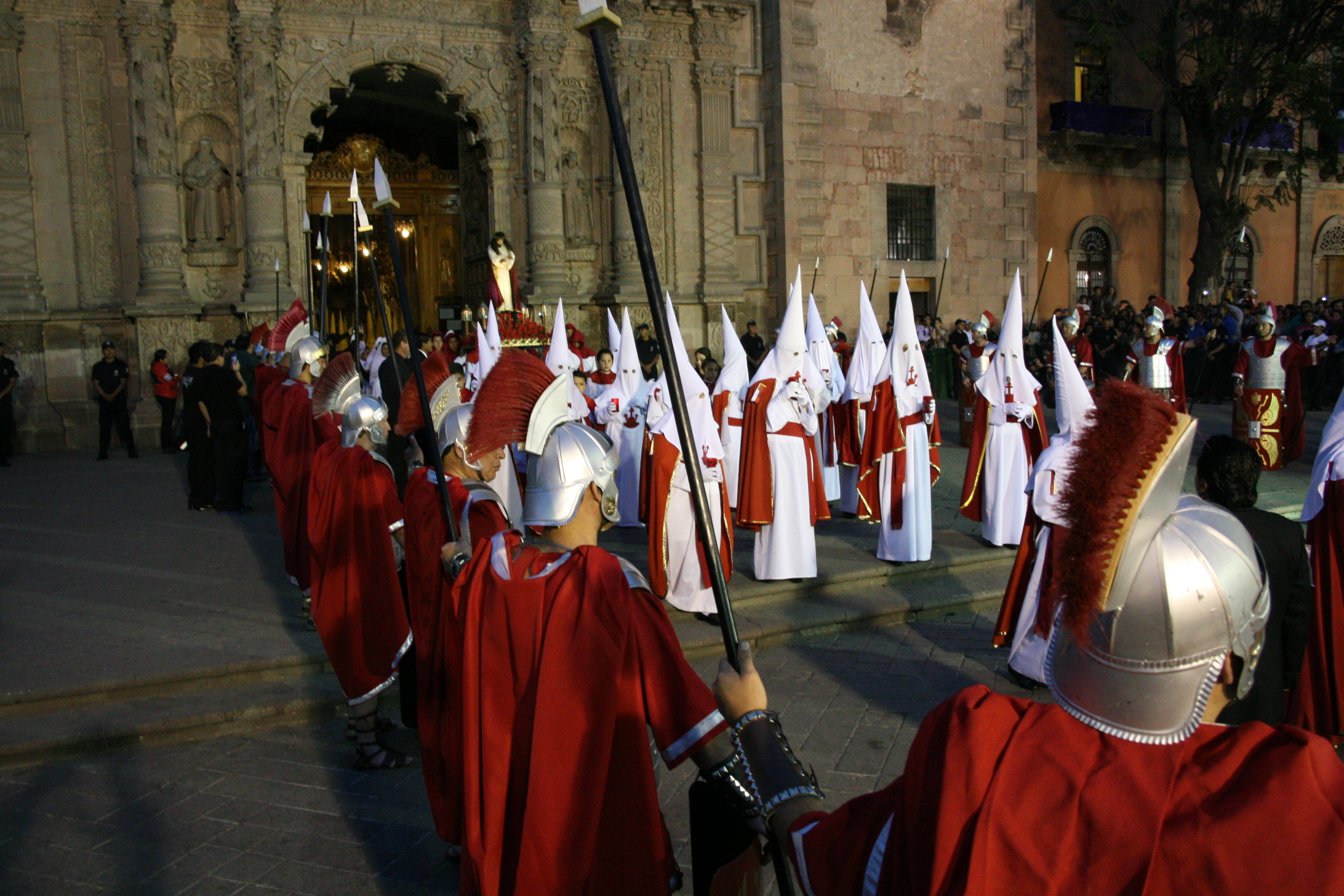
First brotherhood leaving the El Carmen church

The procession takes place on Good Friday, in the historical center of the city of San Luis Potosi, which is filled with churches and colonial era buildings. Illuminated with candles, the area has a church-like atmosphere and even though thousands of spectators line the streets, no one will speak during the hours of the procession, which gives it the name.

The main participants of the procession are the members of various religious brotherhoods, who carry and accompany large platforms with religious images through the streets. In 2013, there were thirty such brotherhoods which included the Cofradía del Virgen del Carmen, the Cofradía del Santo Entierro, Cofradía del Descendimiento, Cofradía del Ecce Homo and the Cofradía de la Soledad, which carries an image of Our Lady of Solitude. The members of the various brotherhoods are identified by the colors of their garments, which identified their home parish and shows the influence of the processions of Seville. The most noticeable participants are the costaleros, which were a special tunic and pointed hoods with cloths covering the faces. The brotherhoods participate as a form of penance, with faces covered and some even walking with chains attached to their ankles. Other participants include adults and children in various dress which include altar boys, Nazarenes, Our Lady of Macarena, Roman soldiers, women wearing traditional Potosi rebozos and carrying candles, bullfighters, politicians and artists.

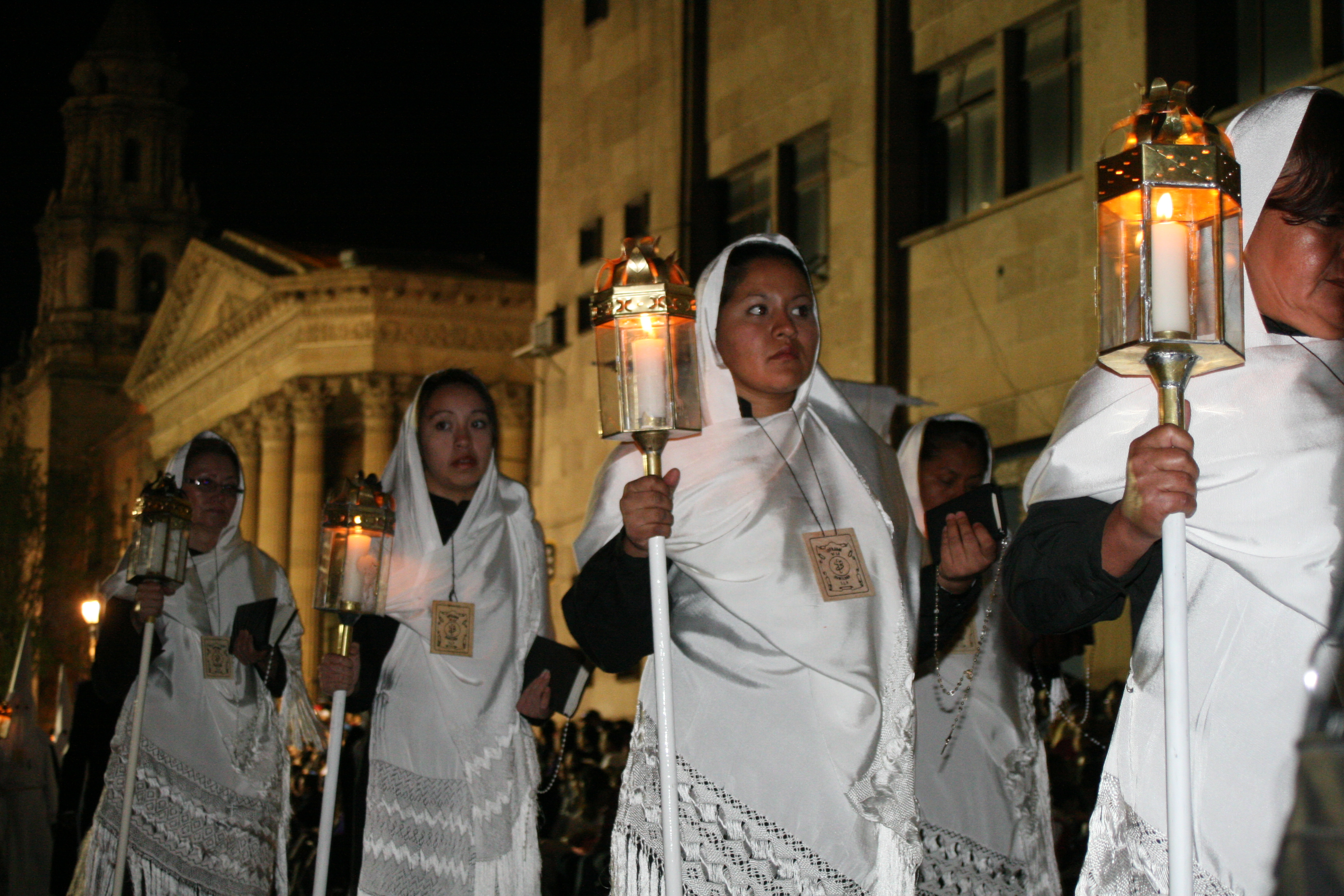
Women in rebozos in the procession

The procession begins at the El Carmen Church at exactly 8pm. The sound of a bugle summons the Praetorian Guard which marches from the Teatro de la Paz to the El Carmen Church. The centurian knocks three times at the main door and the bugler on horseback clears the way and silences the crowd for the procession. The procession contains hundreds of people and begins by crossing the Plaza del Carmen in front of the church. Just this portion of the procession takes two hours. The entire event lasts over four hours and winds its way along the main streets of the historic center, passing landmarks such as the Mask Museum, the Government Palace the main city plaza and the cathedral over 3.5 km. The main focal points are the platforms carried by members of the brotherhoods, which can weigh up to 500 kilograms, which bear religious images adorned with fresh flowers. Some of the platforms have been made by local artisans and others imported from Seville, Spain. The participants walk slowly and solemnly, with the pace measured by drumbeats. At certain points in the procession, trumpets are sounded. There are twenty three main platform, with the end of the procession marked by that dedicated to Our Lady of Solitude. This image is ornate Baroque and created by Manuel Tolsá. and wears a Seville style cloak.

== The procession as part of Holy Week in San Luis Potosi ==
The procession is the highlight of two weeks of activities related to Holy Week, which include those of religious, cultural and sporting nature, beginning on the Viernes de Dolores, the Friday before Palm Sunday. On this day, crowds gather on a small alley called Callejón del Buche to create altars dedicated to the Virgin Mary as Our Lady of Sorrows. During the rest of the week more altars are assembled depicting the various Stations of the Cross, with some of these destined to be carried during the Good Friday procession.

Palm Sunday is marked with a simple procession to the city cathedral for the blessing of palms. On Maundy Thursday, there is another procession with seven platforms that visit the various main neighborhoods of the city and their main churches. In the churches, the images of saints are covered on purple cloths as a sign of mourning, bread is distributed to remember the Last Supper and sprigs of chamomile are blessed. During the day on Good Friday, the main event is a reenactment of the crucifixion in the San Juan de Guadalupe neighborhood, and on Holy Saturday, the Burning of Judas occurs on the Plaza de los Fundadores.

The Holy Week season stretches for two weeks and various secular events are sponsored by government and private entities during this time. These include art exhibitions, concerts, conferences, guided tours and volleyball and basketball tournaments. They also include a half marathon between Venado and Charcas and a national youth tennis tournament.

== History ==
The modern event has its origins in the traditions of processions during Holy Week (Semana Santa) established in New Spain early in the colonial period, which included the hiding of the faces of participants. The first procession of silence was instituted by the Carmelites in Mexico City.

However, this particular procession was officially established in 1954. At this time, bullfighters Fermín Rivera, Carmelite priest Nicolás de San José and others began a small event to enact the Stations of the Cross and pay homage to Our Lady of Solitude by the guild of bullfighters at the El Carmen church. It is based on the annual procession in Seville, Spain in honor of Our Lady of Macarena, although this version is dedicated to Our Lady of Solitude, because of the devotion of the bullfighters to this image of the Virgin Mary.

Today, it is the only procession in Mexico to include altars depicting all stations of the cross. It was declared part of the cultural heritage of the state of San Luis Potosí in 2013 as well as the most important civic and religious event of the state. In 2014, the city paid homage to the founders of the modern event, including Fermín Rivera, María de los Ángeles Agüero Ereño, Marco Tulio Jiménez, Carlos Artolózaga Noriega and Juan Hernández Auces.
