= Huichol language =

Indigenous language of Mexico

Huichol
- Wixárika Niukiyari
- Native to: Mexico
- Region: Jalisco, Nayarit, Durango, Zacatecas, San Luis Potosí United States: La Habra, California; Houston, Texas
- Ethnicity: Huichols
- Native speakers: 60,000 (2020 census)
- Language family: Uto-Aztecan: Corachol; Huichol

Official status
- Regulated by: Instituto Nacional de Lenguas Indígenas (INALI)

Language codes
- ISO 639-3: hch
- Glottolog: huic1243
- ELP: Huichol
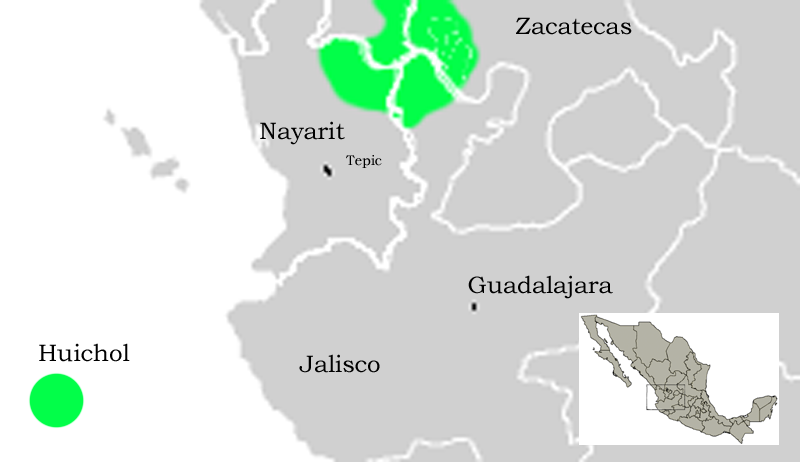
- Map of Huichols in Mexico

- Huichol is classified as Vulnerable by the UNESCO Atlas of the World's Languages in Danger.

The Huichol language (English: /wiːˈtʃoʊl/; Huichol: Wixárika) is an indigenous language of Mexico which belongs to the Uto-Aztecan language family. It is spoken by the ethnic group widely known as the Huichol (self-designation Wixaritari), whose mountainous territory extends over portions of the Mexican states of Jalisco, San Luis Potosí, Nayarit, Zacatecas, and Durango, mostly in Jalisco. United States: La Habra, California; Houston, Texas. Under the 2003 Law on Indigenous Language Rights, the indigenous languages of Mexico along with Spanish are recognized as "national languages".

In regard to language typology, the language has switch-reference, is highly polysynthetic and verbs may consist of as many as 20 different morphemes.

In recent years, at least two teaching grammars for Huichol have been produced in Mexico for nonnative speakers. In addition, a project to produce a reference grammar and dictionary of Huichol has been underway since the 1980s, conducted by a team of investigators in the Department of Indigenous Languages at the University of Guadalajara, and the first volume of the reference grammar was published in 2006.

== Classification ==
The Huichol and Cora languages (whose territories are contiguous) form the Coracholan subgroup of the Uto-Aztecan languages.

== Dialects ==
There are many dialects of Huichol, including Coyultita, Northern Huichol (Huichol del norte), Southern Huichol (Huichol del sur), San Andrés Cohamiata (Huichol del oeste, Western Huichol), and San Sebastián-Santa Catarina (Eastern Huichol, Huichol del este).

== Speakers ==
According to the United Nations Educational, Scientific, and Cultural Organization (UNESCO), there were 35,724 speakers of Huichol as of 2005. Huichol has been classified by UNESCO as a "vulnerable" language.

== Phonology ==
=== Vowels ===
There are five vowel phonemes: /i, ɛ, a, u, ɨ/; /ɛ/ is spelled 'e'. /ɨ/ is phonetically [ɨ], a high central unrounded vowel, similar to the 'e' in the word 'roses' in English.

==== Articulation of vowels ====
[ɛ] is reported to be even more open than the similar half open front vowel of French, but less open than the [æ] of English 'cat'. [a] is low central.

==== Suprasegmental phonemic contrasts ====
Length is phonemic for vowels. A long vowel is marked by a pair of identical vowel letters. Some minimal pairs:

- ʔiiya 'to drink', ʔiya 'to chew';
- ʔeetsiya 'to cook', ʔetsiya 'sown field';
- pukuʔeewiene 'looking for a place to get out of the rain', pukuʔewiene 'walking around tending to things'.

Stress accent is phonemic. The default position for word stress in Huichol is the penultimate syllable (the next to last syllable), as in Spanish and English. When a word has primary stress on the penult, the orthography does not mark it. When the primary stress of the word falls on a syllable other than the penult, the stress is marked with the acute accent (as in Spanish). When there is a need to mark stress on a long vowel, the acute accent is placed on the second vowel letter. Minimal pairs showing phonemic syllable stress:

- tuaxa 'to shoot', tuaxá 'oak';
- kɨpi 'close one's eyes', kɨpí 'butterfly'.

=== Consonants ===
There are thirteen consonant phonemes. /t͡s/ has two allophones, the affricate, [ts] by default and the fricative, [s] when it immediately precedes another consonant. /h/, which Grimes (1955) groups with /w y/ for morphophonemic reasons, is phonetically the glottal voiceless fricative, [h]. The boldfaced symbols in parentheses are the symbols used in the Huichol orthography, where these differ from the linguists' symbols.

		Bilabial	Apicoalveolar	Palatal	Velar	Labiovelar	Glottal
Nasal		m	n				
Plosive		p	t		k	kʷ ⟨kw⟩	ʔ
Fricative			t͡s ~ [s]				h
Rhotic	Trill		r ⟨x⟩				
Rhotic	Flap		ɾ ⟨r⟩				
Approximant		w		j ⟨y⟩			

==== Articulation of consonants ====
/k/ before /i/ is aspirated. /k/ before /ɛ/ is palatalized, hence the pronunciation of /kɛ/ is [kjɛ]. /w/ is [w] before /a ü/, [β] (voiced bilabial fricative) before /e i u/. The sequence /wu/, 'vu' occurs only in loanwords from Spanish.

===== Articulation of /ts r ɾ/ =====
/r, ɾ/, while basically alveolar, have a retroflex quality. The descriptions of the phonetic content of these two phonemes vacillated from McIntosh (1945:31–32) to Grimes (1955:31) to Grimes (1959:221, 223).

McIntosh described [t͡s s] as "alveolar" and considered these two to be allophones of the same phoneme, with [t͡s] being the main allophone. Grimes agreed with this: he never uses 's' in his list of 13 phonemes.

McIntosh described r as "a voiced retroflex alveolar flap" and x as "backed alveolar . . . somewhat retroflex"; "backed alveolar" seems to correspond to the term "postalveolar" in more modern phoneticians' jargon. Among phoneticians, the alveolar ridge is seen as a range, not a point, in the sagittal (front to back) dimension of the roof of the mouth. Phoneticians optionally distinguish between prealveolar and postalveolar (and likewise between prepalatal, midpalatal, and postpalatal). It must be understood that in the jargon, pre- and post- do not have their normal English meanings. Postalveolar means "the rear portion of the alveolar ridge", not "a region behind the alveolar ridge", while prepalatal means "the front portion of the palate (immediately behind the alveolar ridge)", not "a region in front of the palate". Thus, the descriptions "backed alveolar" and "somewhat retroflex" are consistent (perhaps even duplicative). Grimes (1955) described the allophone symbols [r] as "retroflex reverse flap" and [z s] as "retroflex", but he amended this to "apicoalveolar affricate, fricative, and flap /t͡s r ɾ/ (the latter two with retroflex quality)". The description, "reverse flap" was not defined. By way of conjecture, it may mean that the tongue tip (apex) travels up and backward during the flap articulation instead of straight up or up and forward.

=== Syllable structure ===
Syllables have one of the following structures (C = consonant, V = vowel, V^ = long vowel): CV; CV^; CVV (the two vowels differ in articulation), at least in the base form of words; in speech and sometimes in writing, the elision of vowels creates sequences in violation of these syllable canons. In syllables of the last type, the two vowels form a diphthong in which the first vowel is the most prominent. The language has a large number of diphthongs; both ascending diphthongs and descending diphthongs occur. Examples (period marks syllable boundary):

- ʔɨi.tɨa 'to give';
- niɨ.tɨa 'to lend';
- xei.ya 'to see';
- xie.te 'bee'

(the diphthongs are different in the initial syllables of ʔɨi.tɨa and niɨ.tɨa). The sequences /wV/ are distinct from /uV/, likewise /yV/ is distinct from /iV/. /uV/ and /iV/ are diphthongs, and to form a valid syllable in Huichol, they must be preceded by a consonant.

=== Intonation ===
Grimes (1959) investigated the affective use of intonation.

== Orthography ==
The alphabet currently in use to teach Huichol-speaking children to be literate in their native language is

a e h i ɨ k kw m n p r t ts u w x y ʔ

Formerly, ɨ has been written as ü. Often, on keyboards without ɨ, speakers use + instead.

For x an alternative spelling rr is seen, even in recent linguistic scholarship and lay publications. When the IPA symbol for the glottal stop, ʔ, is not available with the typing device being used, the apostrophe is used instead.

== Morphology ==
Huichol is a highly polysynthetic language with a strong tendency to head-marking.

== Media ==
Huichol-language programming is carried by the CDI's radio station XEJMN-AM, broadcasting from Jesús María, Nayarit.

Popular Mexican music group Huichol Musical, made up of four Huichol men from Santa Catarina, Mezquitic, Jalisco, write songs that fuse the Huichol language and music style with Spanish lyrics and more current music trends. Their biggest hit, "Cuisinela" garnered attention worldwide and their album by the same name was Grammy nominated in the "Best Regional Mexican Album" category in 2008.

== Bibliography ==
(Coincidentally, McIntosh 1945 and Grimes 1955 have identical paginations, 31–35.)

- Campbell, Lyle. 1997. American Indian languages: the historical linguistics of Native America. Oxford University Press. Series: Oxford studies in anthropological linguistics; 4.
- Gaceta Universitaria. 20 February 2006. El huichol debe escribirse. Guadalajara, Jalisco, Mexico: University of Guadalajara.
- Grimes, Joseph E. 1955. Style in Huichol discourse. Language, 1955 Jan–March, 31(1):31–35.
- Grimes, Joseph E. 1959. Huichol Tone and Intonation. International Journal of American Linguistics, 1959 October, 25(4):221–232.
- Grimes, Joseph E. 1964. Huichol syntax. Mouton.
- Grimes, José E., et al. 1981. El Huichol: Apuntes Sobre el Lexico.
- Iturrioz Leza, José Luis, ed. 2004. Lenguas y literaturas indígenas de Jalisco. Guadalajara: Secretaría de Cultura, Gobierno Estatal de Jalisco. Colección: Las culturas populares de Jalisco.
- Iturrioz Leza, José Luis, Julio Ramírez de la Cruz, et al. 1999. Gramática Didáctica del Huichol: Vol. I. Estructura Fonológica y Sistema de Escritura (in PDF). Guadalajara: Departamento de Estudios en Lenguas Indígenas, Universidad de Guadalajara; Secretaría de Educación Pública. This is volume XIV of Función.
- Iturrioz Leza, José Luis, Paula Gómez López, and Xitákame Ramírez de la Cruz. 2004. Morfología y sintaxis del nombre. In Iturrioz Leza, JL, ed. Lenguas y literaturas indígenas de Jalisco. Guadalajara: Secretaría de Cultura, Gobierno del Estado de Jalisco.
- Leyco. Text of the Ley General de Derechos Lingüísticos de los Pueblos Indígenas (General Law of the Language Rights of the Indigenous Peoples). In Spanish.
- McIntosh, John B. 1945. Huichol phonemes. International Journal of American Linguistics, January 1945, 11(1):31–35.

== Resources for language learning ==
- Grimes, José (2008). "Hablemos español y huichol (Let's Speak Spanish and Huichol)". Instituto Lingüístico de Verano. Archived from the original on 24 September 2013.
- Santos García, Saúl; Tutupika Carrillo de la Cruz; Marina Carrillo Díaz. 2008. Taniuki: curso de Wixárika como segunda lengua. [Taniuki [Our language], course in Huichol as a second language] Nayarit, Mexico: Universidad Autónoma de Nayarit. 90 pp. In Spanish. (Google Books Page) (copy of the book hosted on academia.edu) (news report announcing publication of the book)
- Wixarika(huichol) – Spanish Translate

=== Vocabulary and dictionaries ===
- Vocabulario huichol (1954) McIntosh y Grimes. 121 p.
- Grimes, José; Barbara Grimes (2008). "'AIXÜA TEPÜTEU'ERIE [Tenemos salud] [We Are Well]". Instituto Lingüístico de Verano. Archived from the original on 2 December 2013.

=== Grammar ===
- Iturrioz Leza, José Luis, Julio Ramírez de la Cruz, et al. 1999. Gramática Didáctica del Huichol: Vol. I. Estructura Fonológica y Sistema de Escritura (in PDF). Guadalajara: Departamento de Estudios en Lenguas Indígenas, Universidad de Guadalajara; Secretaría de Educación Pública. This is volume XIV of Función.
- Iturrioz, José Luis, ed. 2004. Lenguas y literaturas indígenas de Jalisco. Guadalajara: Secretaría de Cultura, Gobierno del Estado de Jalisco. The bulk of the book addresses the grammar of the Huichol language.
- Iturrioz, José Luis & Gómez López, Paula. 2006. Gramática Wixárika I. LINCOM Europa. Studies in Native American Linguistics; 3. ISBN 3-89586-061-1. 268 pp. (Reference grammar)
- Iturrioz, José Luis & Gómez López, Paula. 2009. Gramática Wixárika II/III. München/Munich: LINCOM Europa. 280 pp. (Reference grammar)

=== Audio ===
- "Words of Life – Huichol – Audio Bible stories and lessons". Global Recordings Network.
