= Cora people =

Ethnic group

Cora Naáyarite (singular: Naáyari)
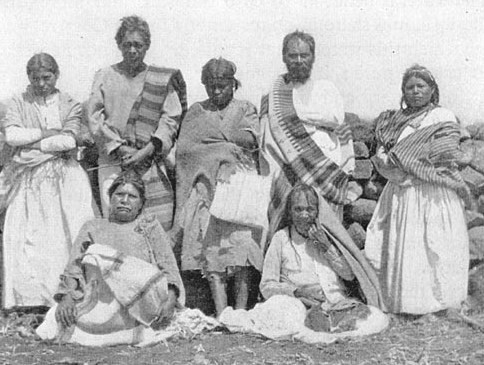
- A group of Cora people photographed by Carl Sofus Lumholtz in 1896.

Total population
- Mexico: 24,390 (Mexican census 2000) (figure includes members of households where at least one parent or elder is a self-declared speaker of the Cora language)

Regions with significant populations
- Mexico (states of Nayarit, Jalisco, Durango), United States (Colorado, Nevada, Utah, Arizona)

Languages
- Cora, Spanish, English

Religion
- Syncretism, Animism, Peyotism, and Roman Catholic, Jehovah Witness

Related ethnic groups
- Tepehuanes and Huicholes

The Cora are an Indigenous ethnic group of northwestern Mexico which live in the municipality El Nayar, Rosamorada, Ruiz, Tepic, in the Mexican state of Nayarit, Mezquital in Durango and in a few settlements in the neighboring state of Jalisco. They call themselves náayerite (plural; náayeri singular), whence the name of the present day Mexican state of Nayarit. They reside within a series of comunidades indígenas (colonial land grants) and ejidos (contemporary agricultural communes). The 2000 Mexican census reported that there were 24,390 people who were members of Cora-speaking households, these being defined as households where at least one parent or elder claims to speak the Cora language. Of these 24 thousand, 67 percent (16,357) were reported to speak Cora, 17 percent were nonspeakers, and the remaining 16 percent were unspecified with regard to their language.

The Cora cultivate maize, beans, and amaranth and they raise some cattle.

== History ==
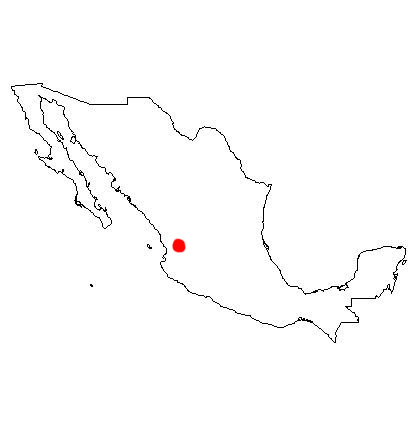
location of the Cora territory in present-day Mexico

The Cora live in the rugged mountain and canyon country of Nayarit and across the border in neighboring Jalisco, Durango, and Sinaloa. In the early 18th century they were an anomaly in that they had never permitted Catholic missionaries to live in their country. They had become a pagan island in a sea of Christian Indians and Hispanic culture. In 1716, a Spanish expedition to attempt to bring the Cora under Spanish control failed. However, in 1722, the Spanish returned in force and the Cora yielded. According to Spanish accounts many of them became Christian and practice, up until the present, "Catholic-derived customs."

Historically, southern subgroups of the Cora included the Coanes/Coanos around Magdalena, Jalisco, the Huaynamota, and the Zayahuecos. Also related to the Cora were the Totorames, who inhabited the coastal plain of Nayarit and Sinaloa, from the Piaxtla River to the Río Grande de Santiago.

== Religion ==
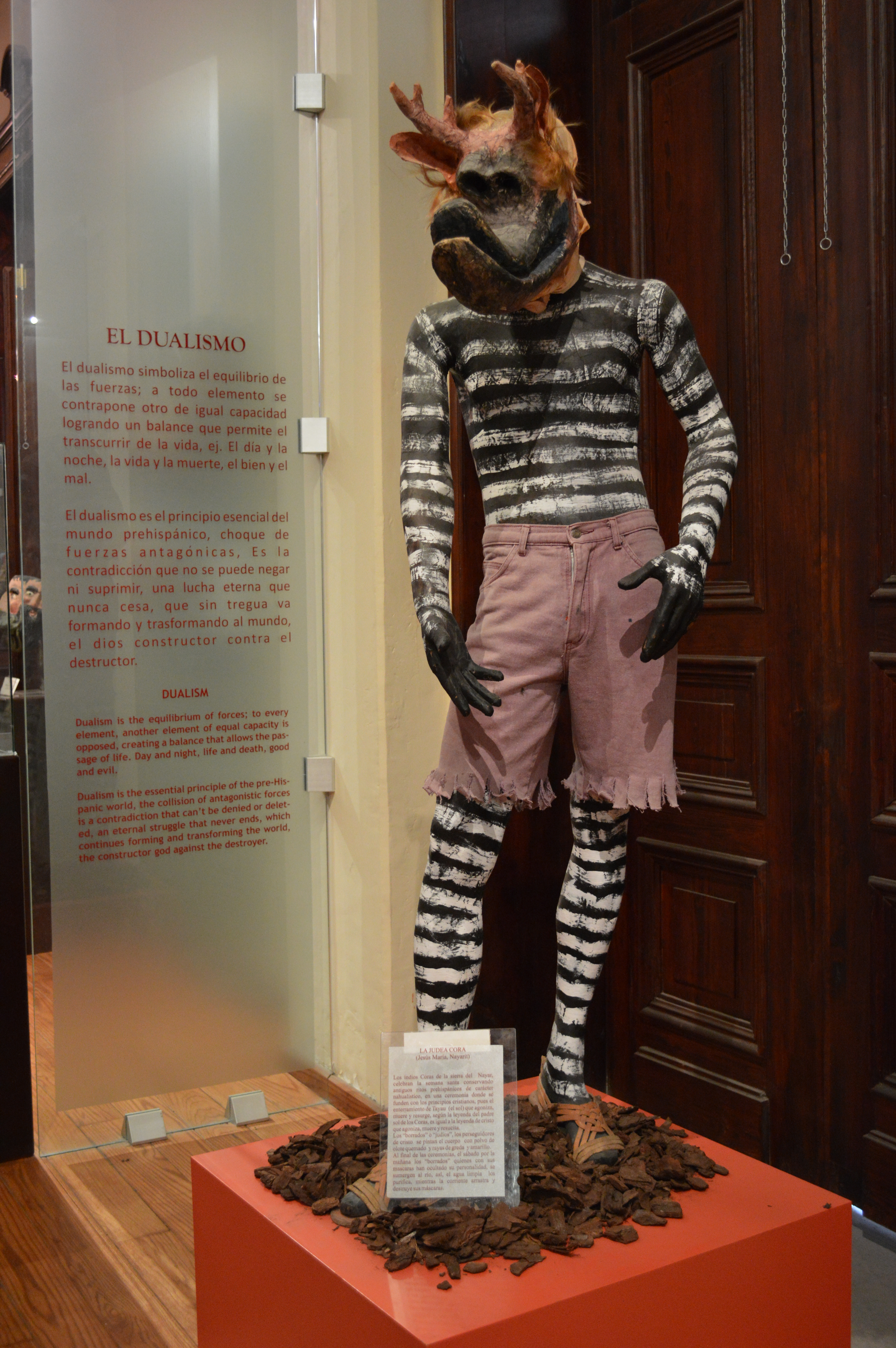
Mannequin of a masked Cora "Judas" dancer at the Museo Nacional de la Máscara.

The Cora religion is a syncretism between the pre-Conquest religion and Catholicism.

The ancestral Cora religion has three principal divinities. The supreme god is the sun god, Tayau, "our father". He travels across the sky during the day, sitting down in his golden throne at noon. Clouds are believed to be smoke from his pipe. In earlier times the priests of Tayau, the tonatí, were the highest authority of the Cora communities. His wife is Tetewan, the underworld goddess associated with the moon, rain, and the west. Her alternate names are Hurima and Nasisa. Their son, Sautari, "the flower picker", is associated with maize and the afternoon. Other names for him are Hatsikan, "big brother", Tahás, and Ora. He is also associated with Jesus Christ.

Some Cora myths clearly have Mesoamerican origins; for example, the myth of the creation of the fifth sun. Others are shared with the geographically and linguistically adjacent Huichol; for example, the myth of the human race being the offspring of a man and a dog-woman who were the only survivors of a mythical cataclysmic deluge.

== Language ==
The Cora language belongs to the Corachol languages branch of the Uto-Aztecan language family.

According to INALI, it has eight dialects:

- Rosarito (spoken in the Rosamorada settlement of Rosarito
- Dolores (spoken in the El Nayar settlement of Dolores)
- Meseño spoken in Mesa del Nayar and surrounding communities
- Jesús María (spoken in the El Nayar settlements of Boca de Arroyo Santiago (Juan López), and Jesús María)
- Francisqueño (spoken in the El Nayar settlement of San Francisco)
- Tereseño spoken in Santa Teresa del Nayar
- Presideño spoken in Presidio de los Reyes and surrounding coimmunities
- Corapeño spoken in San Juán COrapan and surrpounding communities

== See also ==
- Huaynamota
