= Jesús María, Nayarit =

City in Nayarit, Mexico

Coordinates: 20.66667°N 104.2667°W

Jesús María is the municipal seat of the municipality of El Nayar in the Mexican state of Nayarit in Mexico. The population was 1,783 in 2000.

XEJMN-AM, a government-run indigenous community radio station that broadcasts in Cora, Huichol, Tepehuano and Nahuatl, is based in Jesús María.
