= Cora language =

Uto-Aztecan language spoken by the Cora people of northern Mexico and western USA

Cora
- naáyarite
- Region: Mexico: Nayarit, Jalisco, Durango; United States: Colorado, Arizona, Nevada, Utah
- Ethnicity: Cora
- Native speakers: 33,000 (2020 census)
- Language family: Uto-Aztecan: Corachol; Cora

Official status
- Regulated by: Secretaría de Educación Pública

Language codes
- ISO 639-3: Either: crn – El Nayar Cora cok – Santa Teresa Cora
- Glottolog: cora1260
- ELP: Cora
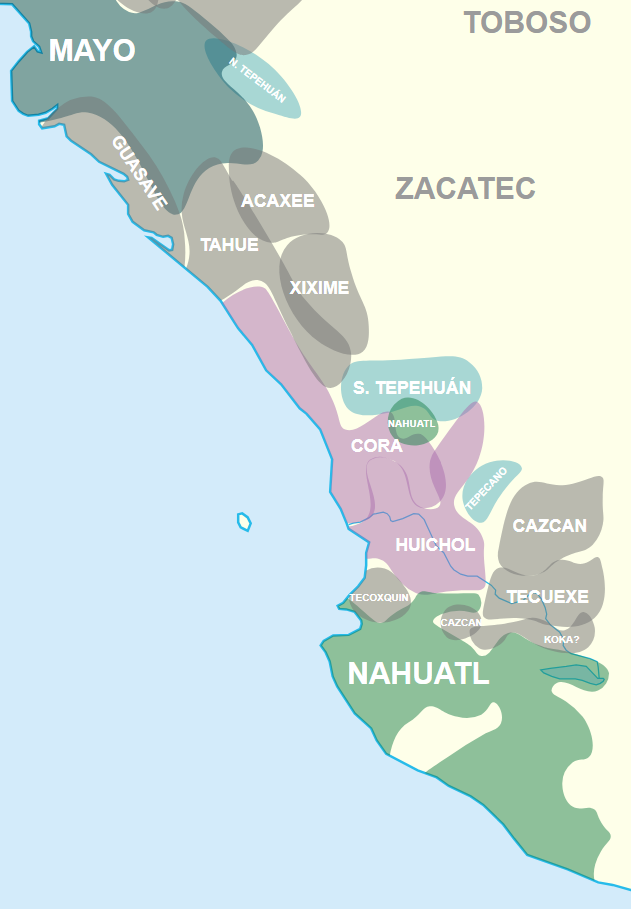
- Precolonial distribution of Cora and surrounding Uto-Aztecan languages

Cora (English: /ˈkoʊrə/) is an indigenous language of Mexico of the Uto-Aztecan language family, spoken by approximately 30,000 people. It is spoken by the ethnic group that is widely known as the Cora, but who refer to themselves as Naáyarite. The Cora inhabit the northern sierra of the Mexican state Nayarit which is named after its indigenous inhabitants. A significant portion of Cora speakers have formed an expatriate community along the southwestern part of Colorado in the United States. Cora is a Mesoamerican language and shows many of the traits defining the Mesoamerican Linguistic Area. Under the General Law of Linguistic Rights of the Indigenous Peoples, it is recognized as a "national language", along with 62 other indigenous languages and Spanish which have the same "validity" in Mexico.

== Geographic distribution ==
Main communities where Cora is spoken in the Nayar municipality

Ethnologue distinguishes two main variants of Cora. One is called Cora del Nayar or Cora Meseño and is spoken mainly in and around the medium-altitude settlements of Mesa de Nayar and Conel Gonzales in the south of the el Nayar municipality of Nayarit, and has approximately 9,000 speakers (1993 census). There are significant differences between some of these varieties and some sources distinguish between Cora Mariteco (of Jesus Maria), Cora Presideño (of Presidio de los Reyes), Cora Corapeño (of San Juan Corapan) and Cora Franciscqueño (of San Francisco). But Ethnologue considers the mutual intelligibility between these and Meseño to be high enough to classify them as a single language.

The other variant recognized by the Ethnologue is called Cora de Santa Teresa or Cora Tereseño and is spoken by approximately 7,000 people (1993 census), for the most part in the high sierra in the north of el Nayar. Cora de Santa Teresa has such a low degree of mutual intelligibility with other Cora speech communities that Ethnologue considers it a separate variety. Due to recent migrations a small community of Coras exists in the United States in Gunnison County in Western Colorado.

== Dialects ==
Cora speakers themselves recognize only five dialects: Cora de Jesús María, Cora de Mesa de Nayar, Cora de Sta. Teresa, Cora de Corápan and Cora de San Francisco. Highland speakers consider Cora of Preseidio de los Reyes to be identical to the dialect of the other lowland community Corápan, and Cora of Dolores to be identical to Cora of Sta Teresa.

Cora is spoken in a number of dialects, some of which have difficult mutual intelligibility. The International Organization for Standardization distinguishes two languages, and the Instituto Nacional de Lenguas Indígenas recognizes nine.

El Nayar Cora / Jesús María Cora (Cora Mariteco)
Dolores Cora
Rosarito Cora
San Blasito Cora
San Juan Corapan Cora (Cora Corapeño)
Santa Teresa Cora (Cora Tereseño)
La Mesa del Nayar Cora (Cora Meseño)
Presidio de los Reyes Cora (Cora Presideño)
San Francisco Cora (Cora Francisqueño)

The Totorame were reported in the 16th century to speak Cora.

== Classification ==
The closest relatives of the Cora language is the Huichol language together with which it forms the Coracholan subgroup of the Uto-Aztecan languages.

- Uto-Aztecan
  - Coracholan branch
    - Huichol language
    - Cora languages

== Phonology ==
The phonology of Cora is typical of southern Uto-Aztecan languages, with five vowels and a relatively simple consonant inventory. However atypically of Uto-Aztecan languages, Cora has developed a simple tonal system or pitch accent with an harmonic accent taking high falling tone. The phonemic inventory given below is the analysis of Cora from Jesús María by Margarita Valdovinos:

=== Consonants ===
| | | Bilabial | Alveolar | | Palatal/ Retroflex | Velar | Glottal |
| | | Bilabial | plain | pal. | Palatal/ Retroflex | Velar | Glottal |
|---|---|---|---|---|---|---|---|
| Nasal | plain | m | n | nʲ | | | |
| Nasal | lab. | mʷ | nʷ | | | | |
| Plosive | plain | p | t | tʲ | | k | ʔ |
| Plosive | lab. | pʷ | tʷ | | | kʷ | |
| Fricative | | β | s | ʃ | ʂ | | h |
| Affricate | | | ts | | tʃ | | |
| Semivowel | | | | | j | w | |
| Liquid | plain | | l | lʲ | ɽ | | |
| Liquid | lab. | | | | ɽʷ | | |

=== Vowels ===
| | Front | Central | Back |
|---|---|---|---|
| Close | i iː ḭ | ɨ ɨː ɨ̰ | u uː ṵ |
| Mid | ɛ ɛː ɛ̰ | | |
| Open | | a aː a̰ | |

There are five contrastive vowels in Cora phonology. They are: [i ɛ a ɨ u]. However, [ɔ] which is produced in the midback area of the mouth is limited to diphthongs when it is followed by the [u] sound. Accents on vowels are to mark stress location. An example of this is (v́).

=== Monosyllables ===
There is a clear partition in both monophthongal and diphthongal combinations. Where words are divorced by rising and falling pitch. However, rising pitch is oftentimes modal and falling pitch shows variation.

Rime shapes in monosyllabic words. (V=monophthong and VV=diphthong)
| Shape | n = | Tonal profile | Phonation |
|---|---|---|---|
| V(h) | 7 | Level/rising | Modal |
| V(h) | 6 | Falling | Modal ~ nonmodal variation |
| VV (h) | 3 | Level/rising | Modal |
| VV (h) | 5 | Falling | Modal ~ nonmodal variation |

The level and rising monosyllables used for the table above are presented in the table below.

Level/Rising
| a. | [sɛh]* | sand |
| b. | [hah]* | water |
| c. | [heh] | yes |
| d. | [ha꞉] | swollen |
| e. | [ɽuh] | life |
| f. | [tyeh] | long |
| g. | [taih] | fire |
| h. | [tʃwah] | earth |
| i. | [sɛih] | other |
| j. | [saɨh] | one |
| k. | [twah] | oak |
| l. | [naiŋ] | all |

Below are the falling monosyllables. Chart relates to the two charts above.

Falling
| m. | [mwa] | you, sg |
| n. | [tsɨ] | dog |
| o. | [tʃi] | house |
| p. | [mu] | head |
| q. | [βɛ] | big |
| r. | [mwi] | much |
| s. | [mwaŋ] | you, pl |
| t. | [weih] | fish |
| u. | [haɨh] | ant |
| v. | [sauh] | quail |
| w. | [sauh] | egg |

=== Disyllables ===
Disyllables add to the existing dimensions of stress. Initial and final stress are common in Cora phonology. These stresses, at times, serve as conversation cues. Cues include but are not limited to high-pitched stressed syllable followed by the devoicing of the final syllable which is left unstressed. Duration of the word and syllable also have a role in location of stress as it relates to disyllables.

== Grammar ==
Cora is a verb-initial language; its grammar is agglutinative and polysynthetic, particularly inflecting verbs with many affixes and clitics. There are a number of adpositional clitics that can also be used as relational nouns. Different types of subject and object marking can form the grammatical relations in the Cora language through the interplay of syntactic features like word order, topicalization, and dislocation processes. This is important for understanding the causative constructions and the grammatical encoding of the causer and causee. Conversely, the importance of understanding the causativation processes in order to process what grammatical features allow for the identification of a verbal base as either stative, intransitive, or transitive, this is due to processes being arranged according to the semantic and formal membership of the base words. Within the Cora language, addressing the agentive verbal bases leads semantic variation to appear, this results in facing the constraints in order to construct the morphological causatives.

=== Nominal morphology ===
Nouns are marked for possession and exhibit several different plural patterns.

==== Pluralization ====
Different classes of nouns mark the plural in different manners. The most common way is by means of suffixes - The suffixes used for pluralization are the following: -te, -mwa, -mwa'a, -tse, -tsi, -kʉ, -sʉ, -se, -si, -ri and -i. Other ways to form the plural is by reduplication of the final vowel of a noun stem or by shifting the accent from one syllable to the other. Another class of works form their plurals by suppletion.

===== Suffix pluralization =====
The suffix "mua and muaʼa" is generally only used to refer to people. Other suffixes include: -tze, -tzi, -cʌ, -sʌ, -se, -si, -ri, and -i.

Examples of each:
| Cora | | Spanish | | English | |
| singular | plural | singular | plural | singular | plural |
|---|---|---|---|---|---|
| bej | bejtzé | urraca | urracas | magpie | magpies |
| tzʌʼʌ | tzʌʼʌcʌ | perro | perros | dog | dogs |
| muarabií | muarabiise | cucaracha | cucarachas | cockroach | cockroaches |
| tuucʌ | tuúcʌsi | camarón | camarones | shrimp | shrimps |
| tátziuʼu | tatziuʼuri | conejo | conejos | bunny | bunnies |
| tajtúhuaan | tajtúhuaani | nuestro gobernador | nuestros gobernadores | our governor | our governors |
| até | atetzi | piojo negro | piojos negros | black lice | black lice (plural) |
| cánʼa | cánaʼasʌ | borrego | borregos | sheep | sheep (plural) |

===== Other forms of pluralization =====
Pluralization can also be indicated by having a vowel reduplicated:

| Cora | | Spanish | | English | |
| singular | plural | singular | plural | singular | plural |
|---|---|---|---|---|---|
| cuaasú | cuaasuú | garza | garzas | heron | herons |

Pluralization is also indicated through the use of accents.

| Cora | | Spanish | | English | |
| singular | plural | singular | plural | singular | plural |
|---|---|---|---|---|---|
| sáʼiru | saʼirú | mosca | moscas | fly | flies |

Pluralization is also indicated by changing words from singular to plural to change of a word into a completely different one.

| Cora | | Spanish | | English | |
| singular | plural | singular | plural | singular | plural |
|---|---|---|---|---|---|
| páʼarʌʼʌ | tʌʼvrií | niña/niño | niñas/niños | boy/girl | boys/girls |
| taátaʼa | téteca | hombre | hombres | men | mens |
| ʌítaʼa | uuca | mujer | mujeres | woman | women |

==== Possession ====
Possessed nouns are marked with a prefix expressing the person and number of their possessor. The forms of the prefix expressing first person singular is ne-, na-, or ni-, for second person singular it is a-, mwa'a-, a'a-. The third person singular is marked by the prefix ru-. A first person plural possessor is marked by the prefix ta-, second person plural by ha'amwa- and third person plural by wa'a-. Furthermore, there are two suffixes. One, -ra'an is used to mark an obviative or fourth person possessor. The other is -me'en used to mark a plural possessum of a singular possessor.

Possessive paradigm
| Number/person of Possessor | Singular | Plural |
|---|---|---|
| 1st person | nechi'i "my house" | tachi'i "our house" |
| 2nd person | achi'i "your house" | há'amwachi'i "Your (pl.) house" |
| 3rd person | ruchi'i "his/her own house" | wa'áchi'i "Their house" |
| 4th person | chí'ira'an "the house of the other" | |
| pl. possessum + 3.p.sg. possessor | chí'imeen "his/her houses" | |

=== Verbal morphology ===
Verbs are inflected for person and number of subject and direct object and object prefixes for 3rd person inanimate objects also show the basic shape of the object. Verbs are also inflected for location and direction. Verbs within the Cora language are also used to distinguish between locations, people, direction, and time.

==== Subject prefixes ====
| | | | | Prefijo (Spanish) | Prefix (English) |
|---|---|---|---|---|---|
| ni | ne | na | nu | yo | me |
| pi | pe | pa | pu | tú | You (informal) |
| | pu | | | él/ella | him/her |
| ti | te | ta | tu | Nosotros | us |
| si | se | sa | su | Ustedes | You (formal) |
| mi | me | ma | mu | ellos/ellas | them/us (masculine/femanin) |

Example:

Jaʼatzuútac a ‘a nuja ‘umé = al rato me voy = I'll go later

Cutzú = está dormido = He's sleeping

==== Object prefixes ====
| | | | Prefijo (Spanish) | Prefix (English) |
|---|---|---|---|---|
| na | naa | naʼa | me | I |
| mua | muaa | muaʼa | te | I |
| ra | raa | raʼa | lo/le | the |
| ta | taa | taʼa | nos | we |
| jamua | jamuaa | jaʼamua | les | them |
| hua | huaa | huaʼa | Los, les | them |

Example:

náatapúajibe = regalame = Gift me

jaʼachune timuáʼachaʼʌʌreʼe = Cuánto te debe? = How much does he owe you?

Pecáraruure = No lo hagas! = Don't do it!

==== Possessive Nouns ====
The prefix me- has three forms in the Cora language: ne, ni, and na. The variations of this prefix appear within different classes of nouns.

| Cora | Spanish Translation | English Translation |
|---|---|---|
| nechiʼi | mi casa | My house |
| natáata | mi papá | My dad |
| nasʌté | mi dedo | My finger |

The prefix "you" is indicated by ether: a, muaʼa, and aʼa.

| Cora | Spanish Translation | English Translation |
|---|---|---|
| achiʼi | tu casa | Your house |
| muáʼajuu | tu hermanito | Your little brother |
| ajuú or áʼajuu | tu hermanito | Your little brother |

=== Syntax ===
Typologically Cora is interesting because it is a VSO language but also has postpositions, a trait that is rare cross-linguistically but does occur in a few Uto-Aztecan languages (Papago, Tepehuán, and some dialects of Nahuatl). A VSO order is verb, subject, and object. This type of syntax form is the most common amongst Cora language. The VSO structure can be changed in order to show emphasis of certain words, phrases, and sounds.

Indirect object moved to the beginning for emphasis:

ne-‘ci muni ‘ya
I-ACC bean give
"Give me the beans!"

Locatives and temporals moved to the beginning of sentence for emphasis:

‘régana simí-le
below go-PAST
"He went down below."

‘ma simí-le
now go-PAST
"He has already gone."

*Temporal má does not have a glottal, but it is added when it is being emphasized.

Emphasis seen in equative sentences:

alué rió huáni hú
that man PN is
"That man is John."

Discontinuous construction can be done by moving an adjective or an adverb to sentence-final position and giving it emphatic intonation:

‘líge alé wikóči napaī-ka piésta olá-le-ru-ga-ra waʼlú
then there PN gather-EMPH fiesta do-PAST-PASS-STAT-QUOT big
"I am told that then they gathered there at Huicochi and a fiesta was held, a big one."

==== Pronoun copies ====
Subject pronoun suffix can co-occur with an explicit subject:

pé ani-á mučí-ru-ka ramué-ka arégimi
just say-CONT be:PL-we-EMPH we-EMPH LOC
"That is what we were saying there."

Subject repeated by use of a pronoun:

Basačí-si ‘líge rowí-si ‘líge alué napaí-ka mučí-me ka-rá-e ehperé-ga hámi
Coyote-also then rabbit-also then they gather-EMPH be:PL-PRTC be-QUOT-DUB live-CONT wilds
"The coyote and the rabbit were living together in the wilds, they say."

==== Focus ====
Focus is a type of emphasis that shows "this very one" or "he himself is the one".

Alué mukí tabilé nakí né yé ‘nalí-na nakí né
That woman NEG want I this very:one-LOC want I
"I don't want that woman. I want this one."

Yéʼ ‘nalí ní-le-ke-‘e
This very:one be-PAST-QUOT-EMPH
"This was the one."

Examples of comparison between continuous construction and discontinuous:

Né boʼné si-méla
I myself go-FUT
"I myself will go."

boʼné simí-ka=ne
myself go-EMPH=I
"I myself went."

==== Apposition ====
Two nouns or noun phrases which have similar grammatical functions can come next to each other with the second further explaining the first:

‘líge alué rió {luísi morío} ani-lí-me
Then that man PN say-PASS-PRTC
"That man named Luis Morillo…"

Apposition can also be seen by a possessive pronoun preceded by a demonstrative pronoun:

Alué né baʼčí-la-ka
That my older:brother-POSS-EMPH
"he (that one) my older brother"

Apposition can also give emphasis by repeating a sentence in different ways.

né-ka aʼlá čeʼwá-ke-‘e gara-bé nahká-la ili-gá alē ćewā-ka né naʼnalī alē-ge ‘má-ro-či
I-EMPH good hit-QUOT-EMPH good-DIM ear-POSS stand-CONT there hit-EMPH I very:one there-side run-pass:by-when
"I hit him about on the ear. I myself hit him when he ran by on the side of the ridge."

==== Postpositions ====
Postpositions are attached directly to a pronominal base of some kind, which is the most common pattern in Uto-Aztecan language.

ta- ham^wan
with us
"with us"

Suffixing a postposition directly to a noun:

m^waka- ta- n
hand- in- his
"in his hand"

wa- is used as a third-person plural postpositional object:

wa- hap^wa
on them

Inverted pronoun-copy construction:

wa-hap^wa?u-huci-m^wa
{them-on their-younger brother-PL}
on their younger brothers

The third-person postpositional base that is used in Cora is ru-. Many of the postpositions in Cora start with he- (or it can be ha- when the vowel that follows harmonizes).

Indirect pronoun-copy construction:

- -hece in/on/for < -he-ce < *-he-ciw < *pi-cii (him-P)
- -hete under < -he-te < *-he-tia < *pi-tua (him-P)
- -hemi with/about < -he-mi < *pi-mi (him=P)
- -ham^wan with/and < *-he-man < *pi-man (him-P)
- hap^wa on/above < *-he-pa < *pi-pa (him-P)

In Cora, the pre- or postpositions can be very similar in their form, but postpositions are typically bound forms and prepositions are free forms. These pairs can be illustrated through the following examples:

hap^wan ?i-čanaka
on ART-earth
"on the earth"

hecen ru-muve
in his-feather
"by means of their feathershaft"

pu-ri hecen watara sai ru-čanaka
he-now in go other his-world
"Now he goes to his other world."

A member of the complex postpositional form is -na

?i-hatea-na-hece
{ART-river-place of-in}
"in the river"

== Spacial concepts within the Cora language ==
The Cora language has a complex system of postpositions within its language. Words such as 'inside' and 'outside' have distinct markers that set them apart. To classify outside, the Cora people use the ending morpheme "u", while inside uses the morpheme "a".

ka-pú=a-tyé-nyee-ri-ʼi m-a-a haa-taʼa
{not-it=outside-in middle-visible-APL-STAT} {MED-outside-foot of slope} water-in
'The river is muddy.'

u-ká-taa-sin mɨ kantiira
inside-down-burn-DUR ART candle
The candle is burning.

The Inside and outside prepositions may not always be clear, in some cases they may be described as relative rather than absolute. The word deep can be classified using either a u or a morpheme.

=== Directional indicators ===
Used to indicate where an action is taking place

| Cora | Spanish Translation | Translation (English) |
|---|---|---|
| jaʼu | hacia allá | Over there |
| jeʼi | hacia acá | Towards here |
| jaʼu and beʼe | ida y vuelta | Round trip |
| ta or taa | arriba | On top |
| ca or caa | abajo | Below |
| ata | alrededor | Around |

== Media ==
Cora-language programming is carried by the CDI's radio station XEJMN-AM, broadcasting from Jesús María, Nayarit.
