= Center for American Indian Languages =

University of Utah Center for American Indian Languages
- Type: Public
- Established: 2004
- Location: Salt Lake City, Utah, USA
- Campus: Map
- Website: www.cail.utah.edu

The Center for American Indian Languages (CAIL) was a research and outreach arm of the Department of Linguistics at the University of Utah. Its mission was to assist community members in the maintenance and revitalization (where possible) of endangered languages, to document these languages, and to train students to do this sort of work.

== History ==
The Center was founded in 2004 by Americanist and historical linguist Lyle Campbell, and located in the Fort Douglas part of the University of Utah campus.

A library containing over 3,000 books and journals on languages of the Americas was part of the center.

== Shoshone language program for youth ==
A summer Shoshone/Goshute Youth Language Apprenticeship Program (SYLAP), held at CAIL since 2009 has been featured on NPR's Weekend Edition program. Shoshoni youth serve as interns, assisting with digitization of Shoshoni language recordings and documentation from the Wick R. Miller collection, so that the materials can be made available for tribal members.

== Closure of center in 2012 ==
In August 2012, the University of Utah announced plans to close the Center for American Indian Languages. "The College of Humanities instead will concentrate language-preservation efforts on Utah's tribal tongues," according to one article. This closure, said to be for focusing efforts on the language of Utah tribes, "has shocked many in the language conservation world." Linguists, including Ives Goddard of the Smithsonian have expressed serious concern about the negative impact on efforts to preserve indigenous languages throughout the Americas.
