= General Law on the Linguistic Rights of Indigenous Peoples =

Mexican law protecting Indigenous languages

General Law of Indigenous Peoples' Linguistic Rights

LVIII Legislature of the Mexican Congress
- Long title: Ley General de Derechos Lingüísticos de los Pueblos Indígenas
- Citation: DOF 13-03-2003
- Signed by: Vicente Fox Quesada
- Signed: 10 March 2003
- Effective: 14 March 2003

Amended by
- DOF 06-04-2010; DOF 18-06-2010; DOF 18-06-2010; DOF 09-04-2012; DOF 15-12-2015; DOF 15-12-2015; DOF 17-12-2015; DOF 20-06-2018
- Status: In force

The General Law on the Linguistic Rights of Indigenous Peoples (Spanish: Ley General de Derechos Lingüísticos de los Pueblos Indígenas) was published in the Mexican Official Journal of the Federation on 13 March 2003 during the term of Mexican President Vicente Fox Quesada. It gave rise to the creation of the National Institute of Indigenous Languages.

This law is a juridical element that specifies the recognition of the individual and collective rights of the persons and peoples who own and practice some of the 68 Indigenous languages of Mexico. In addition, it specifies nations as to be understood by Indigenous languages and national languages, the conditions of application of the decree, and the attributes, purposes and functions of the National Institute of Indigenous Languages. The law also considers Indigenous languages an integral part of the national cultural and linguistic heritage of Mexico.

The LGDLPI, in its Article 4, recognizes Indigenous languages as national languages with the same validity as Spanish:

The Indigenous languages that are recognized in the terms of this Law and Spanish are national languages due to their historical origin and will have the same validity, guaranteeing at all times the human rights to non-discrimination and access to justice in accordance with the Political Constitution of the United Mexican States and the international treaties in the matter to which the Mexican State is a party.

== See also ==
- Languages of Mexico

== Bibliography ==
- Lang, Peter (2008). Traducción e interculturalidad. Actas de la Conferencia Internacional "Traducción e Intercambio Cultural en la Época de la Globalización", May 2006, University of Barcelona (in Spanish). Frankfurt: Internationaler Verlag der Wissenschaften. ISBN 978-3-631-56358-8.
