= Wick R. Miller =

American linguist (1932–1994)

- Miller, c. 1993
- Born: Wickliffe Raper Miller; January 6, 1932; San Ysidro, New Mexico, U.S.
- Died: May 9, 1994 (aged 62); Phoenix, Arizona, U.S.
- Spouse: Joanne Miller
- Children: 2

Academic background
- Education: University of New Mexico (B.A.); University of California, Berkeley (Ph.D.)
- Thesis: The Acoma Language (1962)
- Doctoral advisor: Mary Haas

Academic work
- Discipline: Linguist
- Institutions: University of Utah
- Main interests: Keresan languages; Uto-Aztecan languages

Wickliffe Raper Miller (January 6, 1932 – May 9, 1994) was an American linguist most well known for his work on Keresan languages and Uto-Aztecan, especially Shoshoni and Guarijio. He worked both on synchronic description and historical linguistics. Miller was a professor in the Department of Anthropology at the University of Utah from 1963 until his death.

His extensive unpublished field notes have been archived at the University of Utah, forming an important part of the collection at the Center for American Indian Languages, and have been used for continuing research and language revitalization.

== Publications ==
- Miller, Wick R. (1965). Acoma Grammar and Texts. Berkeley: University of California Press.
- Miller, Wick R. (1967). Uto-Aztecan Cognate Sets. Berkeley: University of California Press.
- Miller, Wick R. (1984). "The Classification of the Uto-Aztecan Languages Based on Lexical Evidence". International Journal of American Linguistics. 50 (1): 1–24. doi:10.1086/465813. JSTOR 1265195. S2CID 144398421.
