= Corachol languages =

Grouping of languages in the Uto-Aztecan language family

Corachol
- Geographic distribution: western Mexico
- Linguistic classification: Uto-Aztecan: Southern; Corachol
- Subdivisions: Cora; Huichol; ?Guachichil †; Zacateco †; Irritila †

Language codes
- Glottolog: cora1259

Corachol (alternatively Coracholan, Cora-Huichol or Coran) is a grouping of languages within the Uto-Aztecan language family. The living members of Coracholan are the Huichol and Cora languages, spoken by communities in Jalisco and Nayarit, states in central Mexico. Guachichil, Zacateco, and Lagunero/Irritila may have belonged as well. However, Cazcan is sometimes believed to have been a Nahuan language instead, and Guachichil has also been linked to the areal Coahuiltecan languages.

Corachol languages are Mesoamerican languages, and display many of the traits defined by the Mesoamerican linguistic area, or sprachbund.

== Languages ==
- Cora
  - Totorame †
- Huichol
  - Tecual †
  - ?Zacateco †
  - ?Lagunero (Irritila?) †
- Guachichil †
