= Santiago Acahualtepec =

- Locality
- Pueblo Santiago Acahualtepec
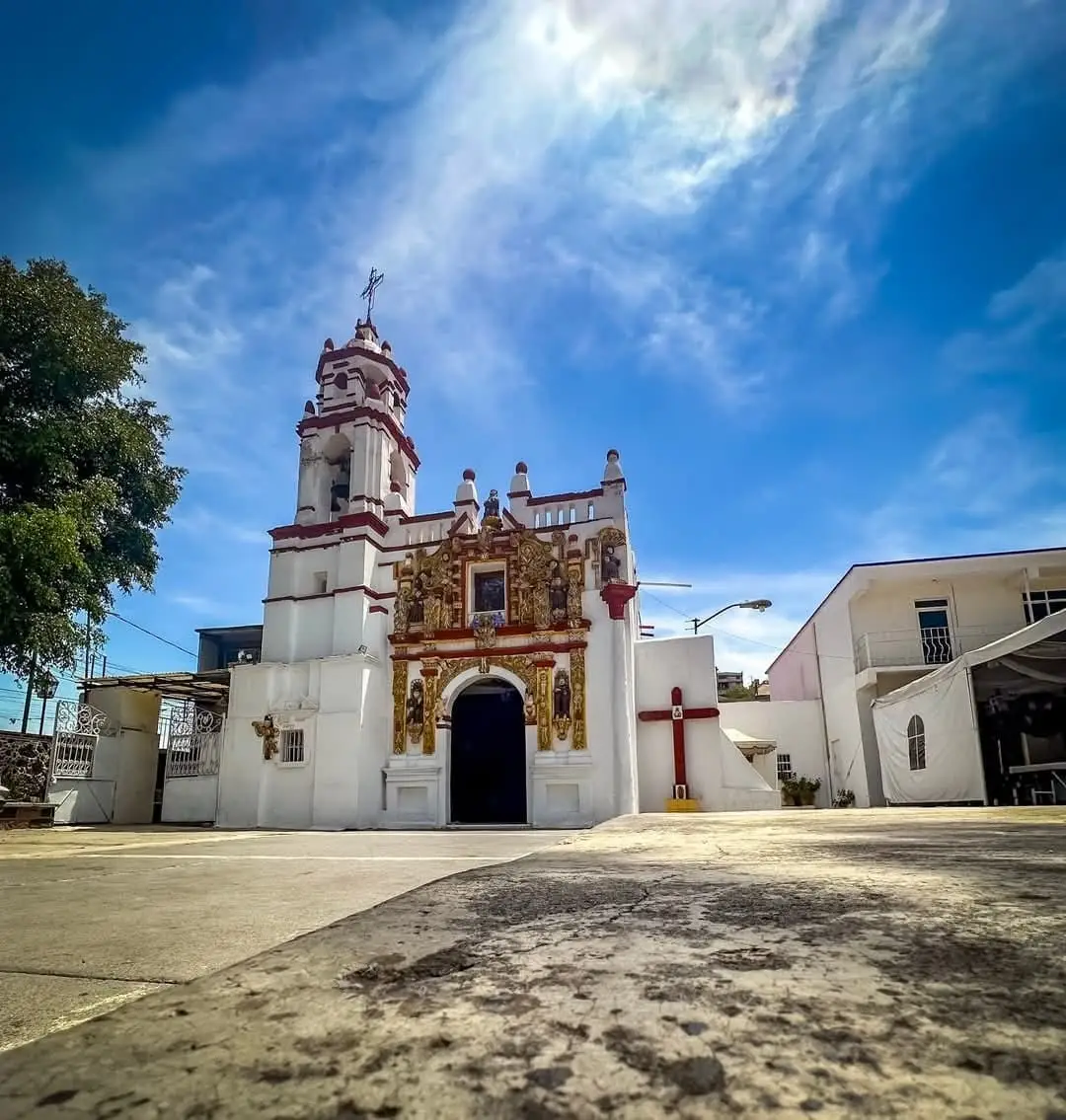
- Santiago Apostle Parish

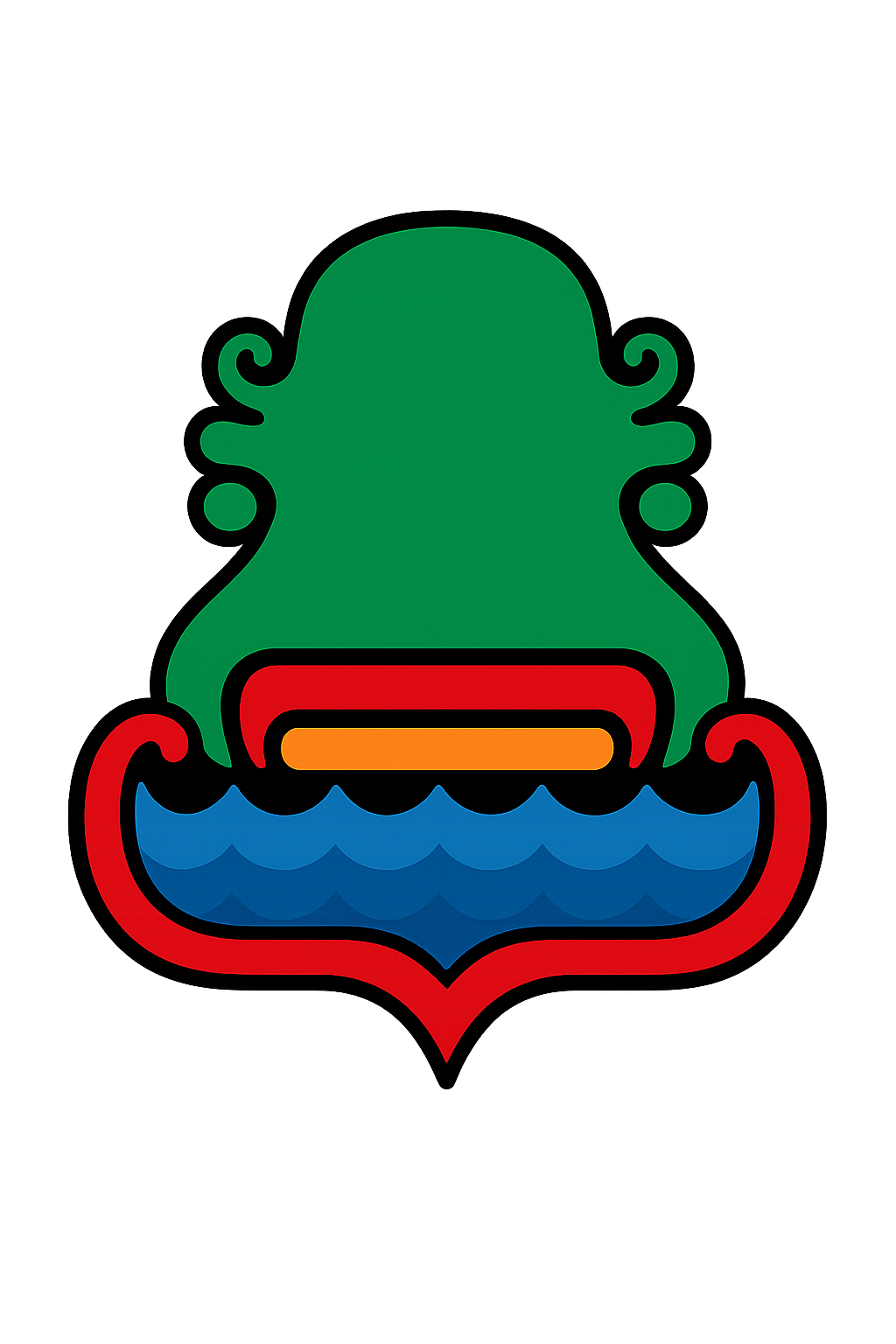
- Emblem
- Nickname: Santiaguito
- Interactive map of Santiago Acahualtepec
- Coordinates: 19°21′15.048″N 99°0′14.213″W
- Country: Mexico
- State: CDMX
- Borough: Iztapalapa
- Patron Saint: Saint Jacob (Moor-slayer)
- Time zone: UTC−06:00 (PST)
- Zip code: 09600
- Area codes: +52 (55/56)

Santiago Acahualtepec (Spanish pronunciation: [sanˈtjaɣo akaˈwaltepek]) is one of the natives towns in Iztapalapa, located east of Mexico City.

It currently borders the town of Santa Martha Acatitla; with the colonias 1st and 2nd Ampliación of Santiago Acahualtepec, Miguel de la Madrid, Ixtlahuacán, and Lomas de Zaragoza, which were part of the farming lands of the natives of the town of Santiago.

== Toponymy ==
Santiago corresponds to the name of the town's patron saint. Acahualtepec is a toponym of Nahuatl origin derived from the words Acahual 'Acahual Flower' and -tepetl 'locative'. It translates as Acahual Hill.

== Traditions ==
This town has festivals and traditions that have been carried out from generation to generation.

=== Carnival ===
The town holds its parade two weekends before Palm Sunday, following thoroughfares (Av. las Torres) and (Ermita Iztapalapa).

=== Major festivities ===
- March or April: Holy Week reenactment begins on Palm Sunday with a brief reenactment of biblical passages. On Holy Thursday, a walking tour is held, visiting the churches of the sister towns. On the last day, Good Friday, the crucifixion reenactment takes place "Las cruces" on thoroughfar eje 6 .
- May 3: Day of the Holy Cross, a cross is left in representative places of the town, and mainly on the top of Tlatixo Hill (Loma Tlatixco).
- June: Feast of the Sacred Heart of Jesus, a tour is made to the homes of each group of charros and costumed people (carnival participants) with a banda collecting their donations of the traditional pyrotechnic 'bull', to finish by burning it in the town square.
- July 25: Major festivity (main festival) in honor of the patron saint, Santiago. This is the town's largest festival, lasting three to five days, featuring traditional dances such as the Santiagueros and the '12 Pares de Francia'. It begins on July 24, with the image of Lord Santiago carrying a long procession through the town's main streets. On July 25, a Catholic mass is held in the parish church in the afternoon, and the traditional fireworks display and pyrotechnic 'Castle' takes place at night. It typically culminates on the following Monday after July 25, with the image carrying a short procession through the town's main streets.

=== Other festivities ===
The town has traditions with smaller activities, such as:

- February 2: Day of the Virgin of Candelaria.
- June: Pentecost 'Día de las mulitas', where Catholic Mass is held in the town parish and children dress up as 'Inditos'.
- December 12: Day of the Virgin of Guadalupe. At the end of the Catholic Mass, the change of stewardship (group of people who administrate of the festivities in a period) takes place.

== Art ==
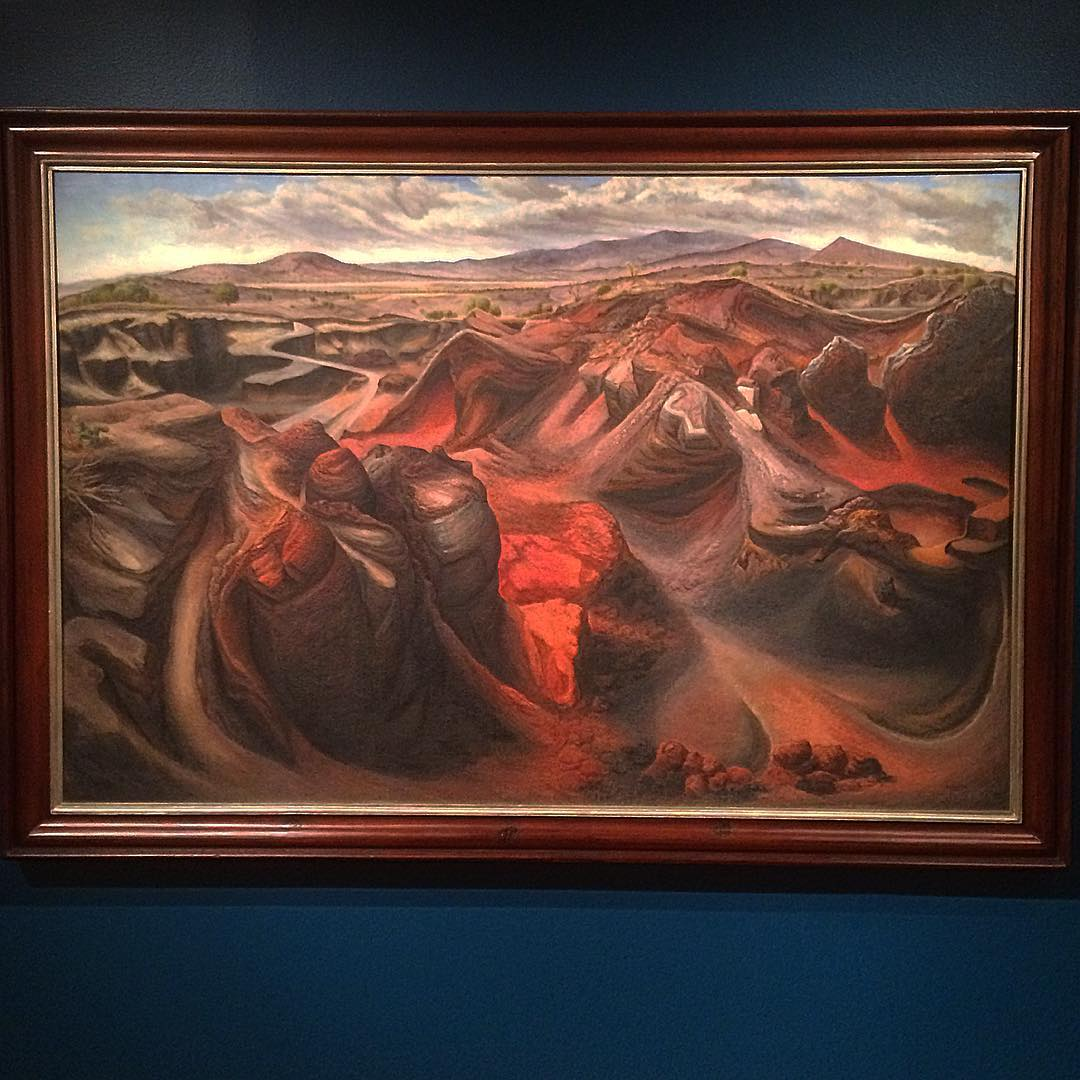
Painting exhibition: Minas Acahualtepec (Museo Soumaya).

In 1950, painter Luis Nishizawa visited one of the Tezontle mines (Tezontlali) and drew a large landscape using oil painting techniques, which allows us to see a sunset from the past.

== Places of interest ==
- Community health center T-III Santiago Acahualtepec
- DIF Josefa Ortiz De Domínguez
- El Pocito de Santiago
- The Crosses (Las Cruces)
- Liconsa Santiago Acahualtepec
- Tlatixco Hill (Loma Tlatixco)
- Santiago Acahualtepec Community Museum
- Panteón Santiago Acahualtepec
- Santiago Apostle Parish
- Territorial "Acahualtepec-Teotongo"
