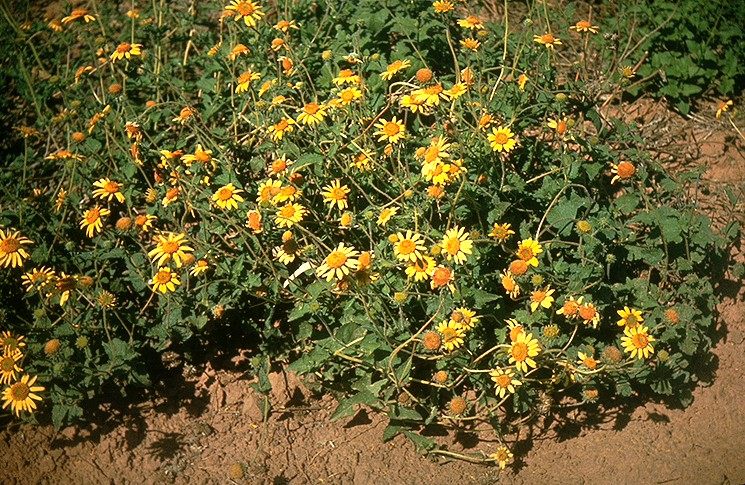
- Simsia calva

Scientific classification
- Kingdom: Plantae
- Clade: Tracheophytes
- Clade: Angiosperms
- Clade: Eudicots
- Clade: Asterids
- Order: Asterales
- Family: Asteraceae
- Subfamily: Asteroideae
- Tribe: Heliantheae
- Subtribe: Helianthinae
- Genus: Simsia; Pers. 1807, not R. Br. 1810 (Proteaceae)

Type species
- Simsia amplexicaulis (Cav.) Pers.

Synonyms
- Encelia sect. Simsia (Pers.) A.Gray; Barrattia A.Gray & Engelm. ex A.Gray

= Simsia =

Genus of plants

Simsia is a genus of flowering plants in the tribe Heliantheae within the family Asteraceae. It includes annuals, herbaceous perennials, and shrubs. They range from the western United States south through Central and South America to Argentina, with the center of diversity occurring in Mexico. The genus is named for British physician and botanist John Sims (1749–1831). Although some species are relatively rare, others have become common weeds that line the roadsides and fields of Mexico, often forming dense stands mixed with Tithonia and other Asteraceae. Some species are known by the common name bushsunflower.

== Description and systematics ==
A feature that characterizes many of the species of the genus and helps to distinguish them from related genera is the extremely flattened cypsela (achene). There are, however, several species in which the cypsela is biconvex, and these are recognized as belonging to Simsia by a group of other, mostly technical features, including nodal disks (stipule-like appendages at the base of the petioles), relatively long and narrow ray ovaries, and long and tapering style branches that lack a pronounced apical appendage.

The genus was thoroughly studied by Spooner using comparative morphology, chromosome counts, and crossing experiments, and based on samples from wide-ranging field work. Subsequently two new species have been documented, and additional species are being transferred into the genus. Although at one time, Simsia was considered to be related to other genera with flattened cypselae, such as Encelia, it is now firmly established that Simsia is part of subtribe Helianthinae (the taxonomic group which includes the common sunflower, Helianthus annuus), and is a close relative of Tithonia

All of the species for which chromosome counts have been made are diploid (x = 17), and crossing experiments suggest that there are few barriers to hybridization between species of the genus. Natural hybridization appears to occur and may complicate identification of some specimens, particularly involving the weedy species such as S. foetida, S. amplexicaulis, and S. lagascaeformis.

Species

- Simsia amplexicaulis (Cav.) Pers. - Guatemala, Honduras, Mexico (from Chihuahua to Chiapas)
- Simsia annectens S.F.Blake - Chiapas, Michoacán, Oaxaca, Guerrero, México State, Jalisco, Nayarit
- Simsia calva (A.Gray) A.Gray – Awnless bush sunflower - Nuevo León, Coahuila, Hidalgo, Tamaulipas, United States (TX NM)
- Simsia caucana Cuatrec. - Cauca in Colombia
- Simsia chaseae (Millspaugh) S.F.Blake - Veracruz, Yucatán Peninsula
- Simsia dombeyana (A.Gray) S.F.Blake - Venezuela, Ecuador, Peru, Brazil, Bolivia, Paraguay, Argentina
- Simsia eurylepis S.F.Blake - San Luis Potosí, Tamaulipas, Veracruz, Campeche, Nuevo León
- Simsia foetida (Cav.) S.F.Blake - from Michoacán to Nicaragua
- Simsia fruticulosa (Sprengel) S.F.Blake - Colombia, Venezuela, Ecuador
- Simsia ghiesbreghtii (A.Gray) S.F.Blake - Chiapas, Guatemala
- Simsia grandiflora Benth. ex Oerst. - Nicaragua, Honduras, El Salvador, Guatemala, Chiapas
- Simsia guatemalensis H.Rob. & Brettell - Honduras, El Salvador, Guatemala
- Simsia hispida (Kunth) Cass. - San Luis Potosí, Michoacán, México State
- Simsia holwayi S.F.Blake - Guatemala, Chiapas
- Simsia jamaicensis S.F.Blake - Jamaica
- Simsia lagasceiformis DC. – Annual bush sunflower - Mexico, Guatemala, United States (AZ TX NM)
- Simsia molinae H.Rob. & Brettell - Honduras, Nicaragua
- Simsia pastoensis Triana - Colombia
- Simsia sanguinea A.Gray - El Salvador, Guatemala, Chiapas, Oaxaca, Puebla, Veracruz, Michoacán, Morelos, México State, Jalisco
- Simsia santarosensis Spooner - Costa Rica
- Simsia setosa S.F.Blake - Sonora, Durango, Nayarit
- Simsia steyermarkii H.Rob. & Brettell - Guatemala
- Simsia subaristata A.Gray - Nuevo León
- Simsia tenuis (Fernald) S.F.Blake - Guerrero
- Simsia villasenorii Spooner - Chiapas, Oaxaca

Formerly included

numerous species now regarded as members of other genera: Encelia Geraea Iostephane Viguiera
