= Carnival of Huejotzingo =

Mexican carnival

Coordinates: 19°9′32.37″N 98°24′29.79″W

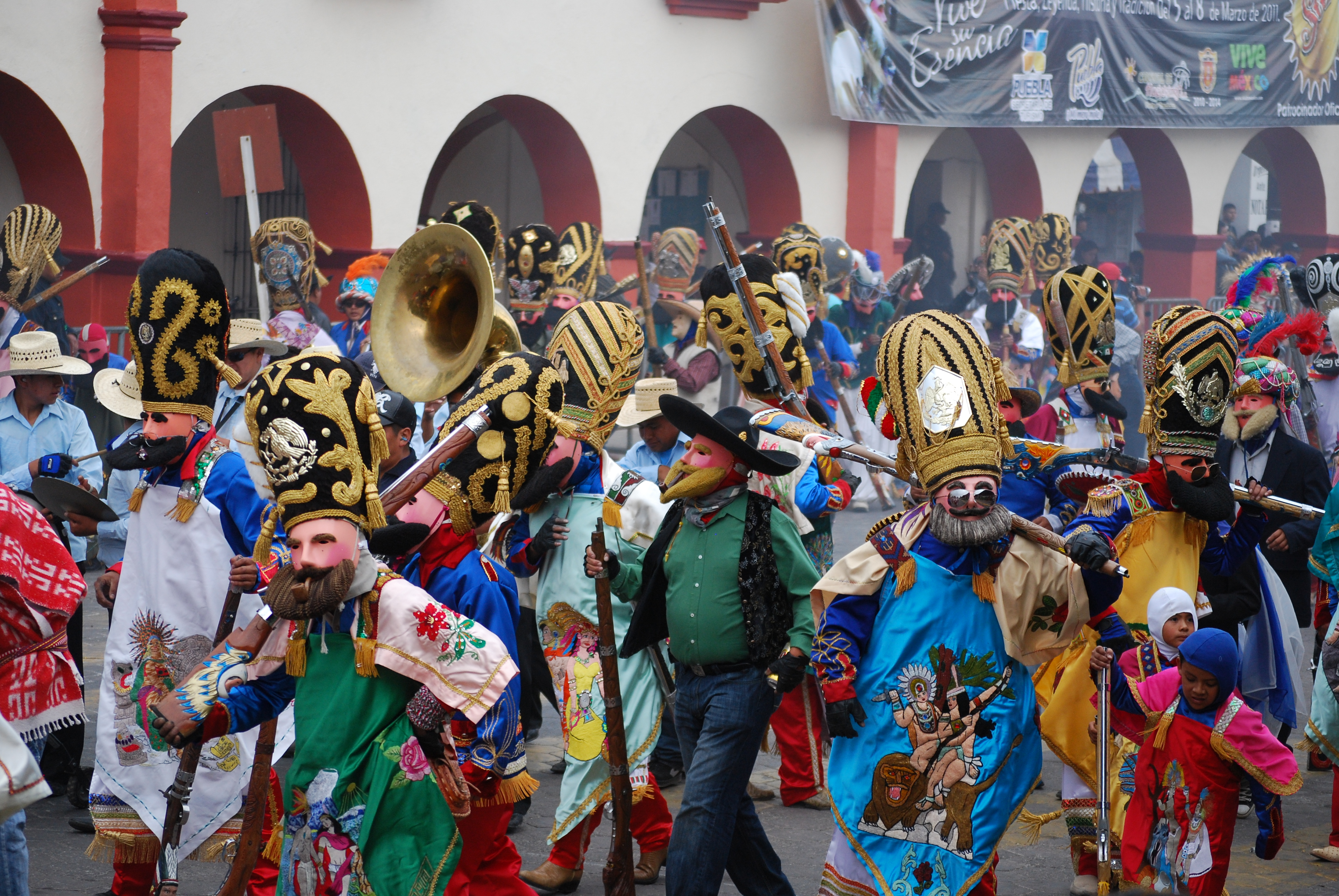
Parade of participants in front of the municipal hall

Carnival of Huejotzingo is one of Mexico's carnivals, which takes place in the Huejotzingo municipality in the state of Puebla.

It is noted for its unique traditions which center on the reenactment of stories related to the municipality's history as well as the use of tons of gunpowder used in handcarved muskets in mock battles and other events. The carnival involves the participation of 12,000 residents in costume, most of which are dressed in outfits related to elements of the armies that fought in the Battle of Puebla. Mock battles related to this event are reenacted as well as a Romeo and Juliet story and the first Catholic wedding and baptism in Mexico.

== The event ==
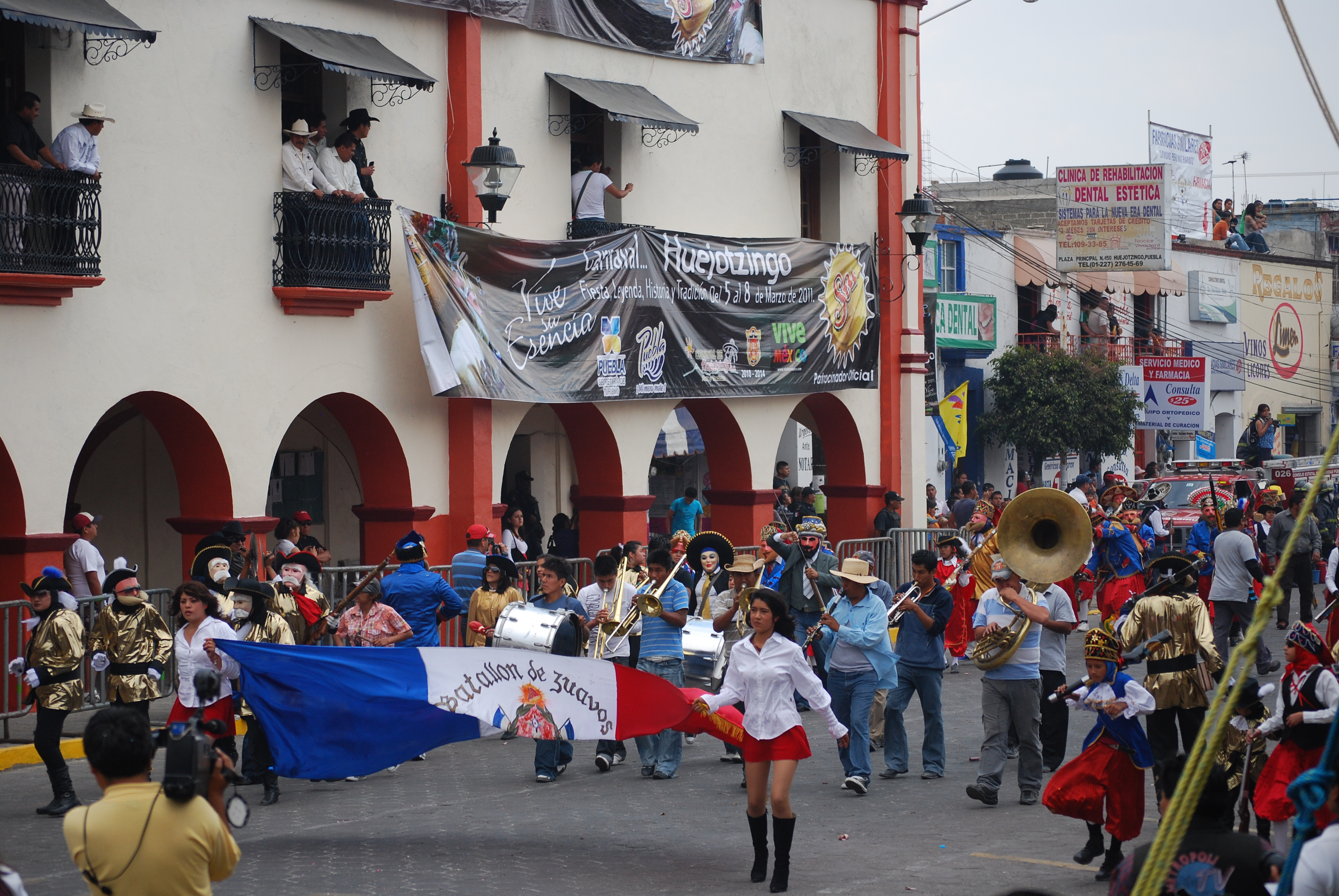
Parade passing by the municipal palace (hall)

The Carnival of Huejotzingo is the only carnival of its kind and one of the most important in Mexico. Festivities start in the morning of the Saturday before Ash Wednesday and end in the evening of Shrove Tuesday, with the most important days being Monday and Tuesday. About 12,000 people of the municipality participate in costume, most which carry hand carved muskets, with which gunpowder is set off.

The activities of this carnival focus on a number of reenactments, although other elements such as “huehue” (meaning old person) dancers also exists. Festivities are daytime, beginning in the morning, with a break for a main meal in the mid afternoon and then continuing until nightfall. There are pre Hispanic elements to this carnival, including the mock battles which have been compared to the “flower wars” of the Aztecs. Carnival coincides with the time that the pre Hispanic inhabitants of Huejotzingo petitioned the gods for fertility of the lands and for abundant rainfall.

The carnival is led by a “General en Jefe de las Fuerzas o Ejercicios Carnavalesco” who is in charge of leading all four days of festivities. S/he is selected at a meeting which occurs just after the end of the current year's carnival. Participants can prepare for up to six months in advance. The garments are still locally made, if not by the participants, then by local craftspeople. Children are also part of the festivities, with their own costumes and small muskets.

The carnival attracts between 32,000 and 35,000 spectators from both Mexico and abroad, bringing about ten million pesos to the municipality. The carnival is also the beginning of the Tianguis Turístico (Tourism Market) .

== The reenactments ==
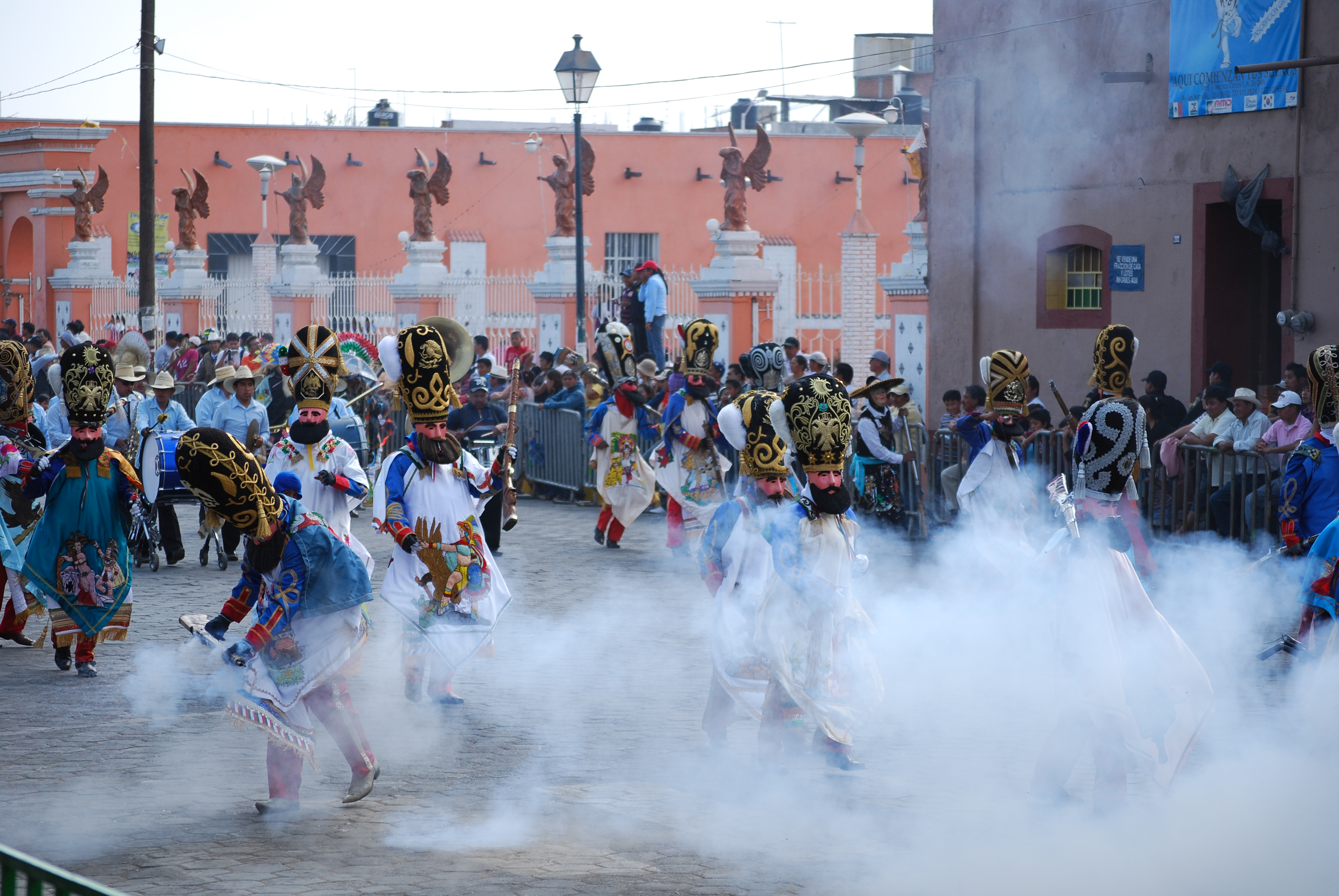
Firing muskets

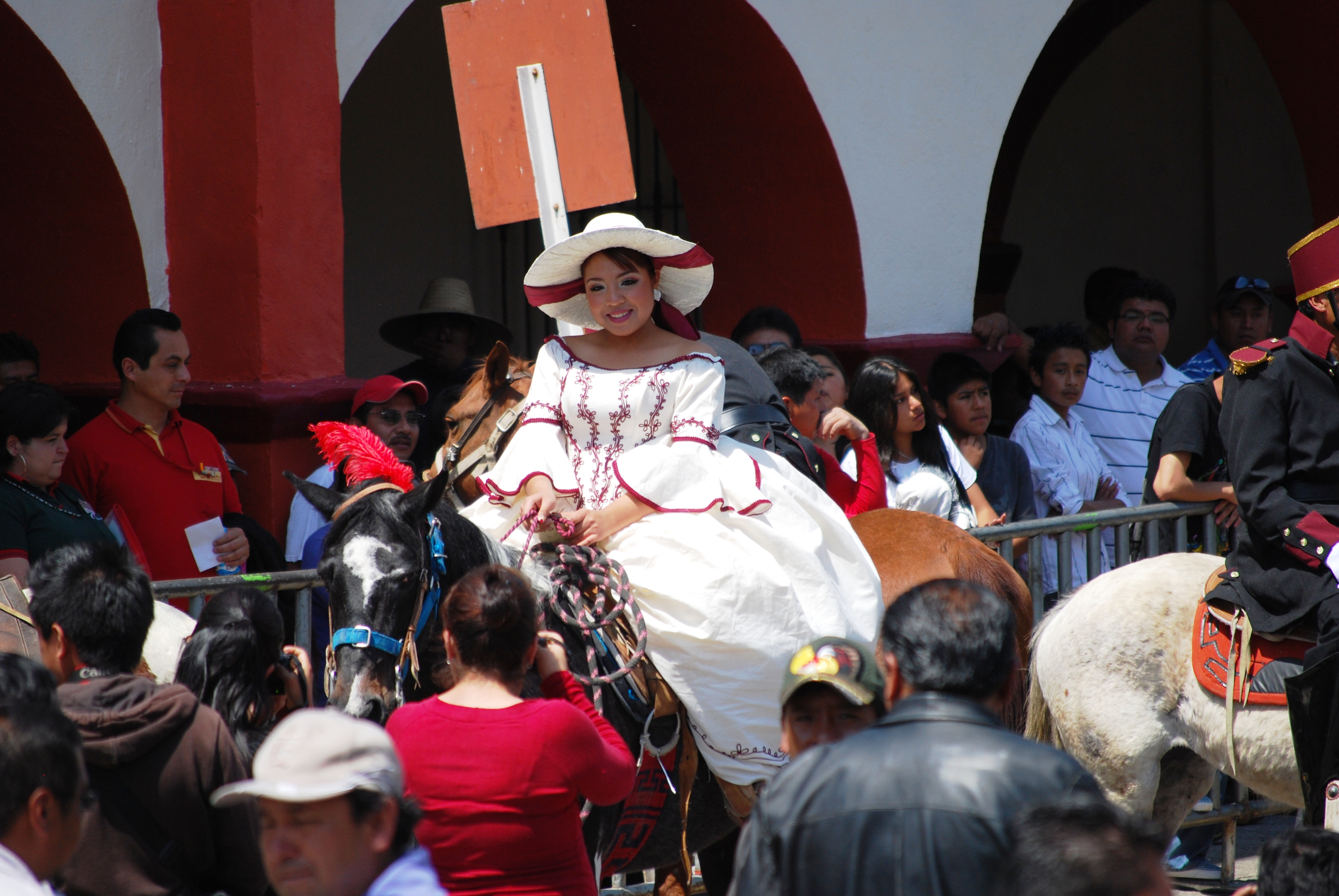
The Corregidor's Daughter on horseback

This carnival is unique in Mexico as it revolves around three major historical/legendary events for the region, the Battle of Puebla, the abduction of the Daughter of the Corregidor and the first Catholic wedding in Mexico. The reenactments are repeated all three days and end at nightfall on the third day.

The most important involve mock battles among different “battalions” of “soldiers” which is loosely based on the historic Battle of Puebla which occurred on May 5, 1862. These occur at various times of the day and continue until those that represent the French Imperial Army loses. The battles can result in enough gun smoke from the powder used in participants’ muskets to cover the town. When not fighting the soldiers either parade, often to the music of live bands. Parades of the battalions start by circling the main square twice, with each battalion followed by a live band. Traditional tunes include La marcha de Zacatecas, Juana Gallo and ¡Que chula es Puebla! played as the soldiers dance and constantly set off their muskets.

The second reenactment is a legend similar to a Romeo and Juliet story which comes from the end of the 18th and beginning of the 19th century. The main protagonists are a bandit by the name of Agustín Lorenzo and the Corregidor's Daughter. Lorenzo was a bandit who operated in what are now the states of Michoacán, State of Mexico, Guerrero, Morelos and Puebla. He fell madly in love with the corregidor's (a public official) daughter but was forbidden to marry her because of social class. However, the daughter was attracted to him and agreed to run away with him.

For this event, about 2,000 people participate, many of them soldiers from the Battle of Puebla reenactment. The young people who play the couple are chosen each year. This action takes place in front of the municipal palace, which stands in as the corregidor's home. One of the generals plays the role of the corregidor. The daughter receives three messages from the bandit. The bandit enters the scene to music, fireworks and musket fire. The daughter is waits for him on the balcony, already dressed in white. The bandit then climbs up to the balcony, subdues the soldiers guarding her and takes her down to his horse. Just before doing so, however, he tosses large amounts of play money to the crowds yelling “Viva la plata” (Long live money (lit. silver)). The couple escapes on his horse as one group of soldiers pursue and the rest of the soldiers fire at the pursuers. At three pm, a priest marries Lorenzo and the daughter. However, the story does not have a happy ending. At four pm is the “quema del jacal” (burning of the shack). This is the burning of a small shack made of palm fronds at one end of the plaza. It represents the house of the bandit with the couple inside. The legend has been interpreted as the hopes for equality among Mexico's social classes after its Independence as the daughter is of the elite and the bandit is poor. The shack is also interpreted as the various wars of Mexico from the “flower wars” of the Mesoamerican era up through much of the 19th century. Simultaneous to the enactment of the Corregidor's Daughter story on the other side of the plaza is another reenactment. Huejotzingo was named one of the four regions to receive evangelizing first, with legend stating that the first weddings and baptisms in the Catholic rite in Mexico occurred here. Both the first wedding and the first baptism of the indigenous are reenacted.

== The battalions ==
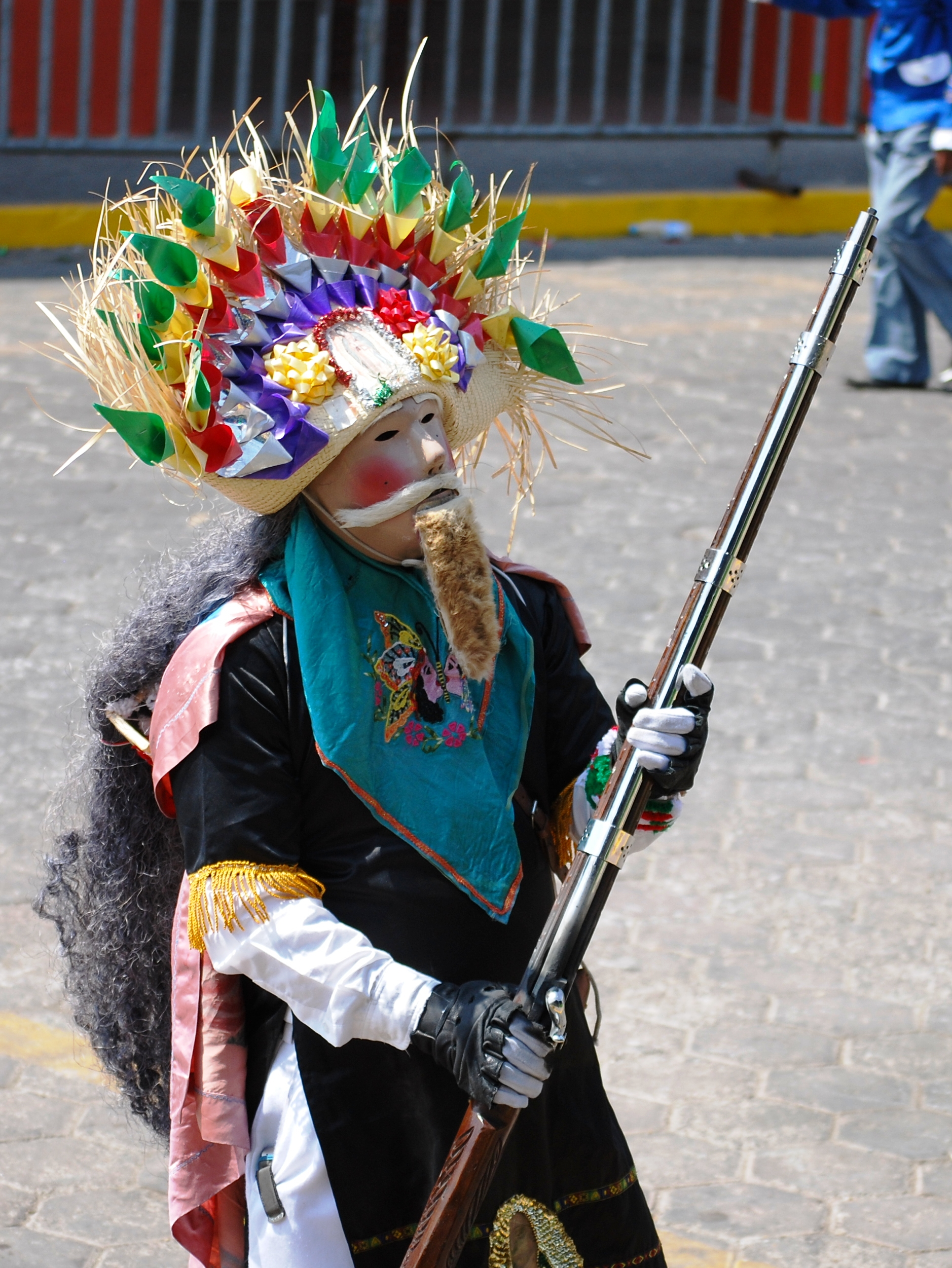
Indio Serrano

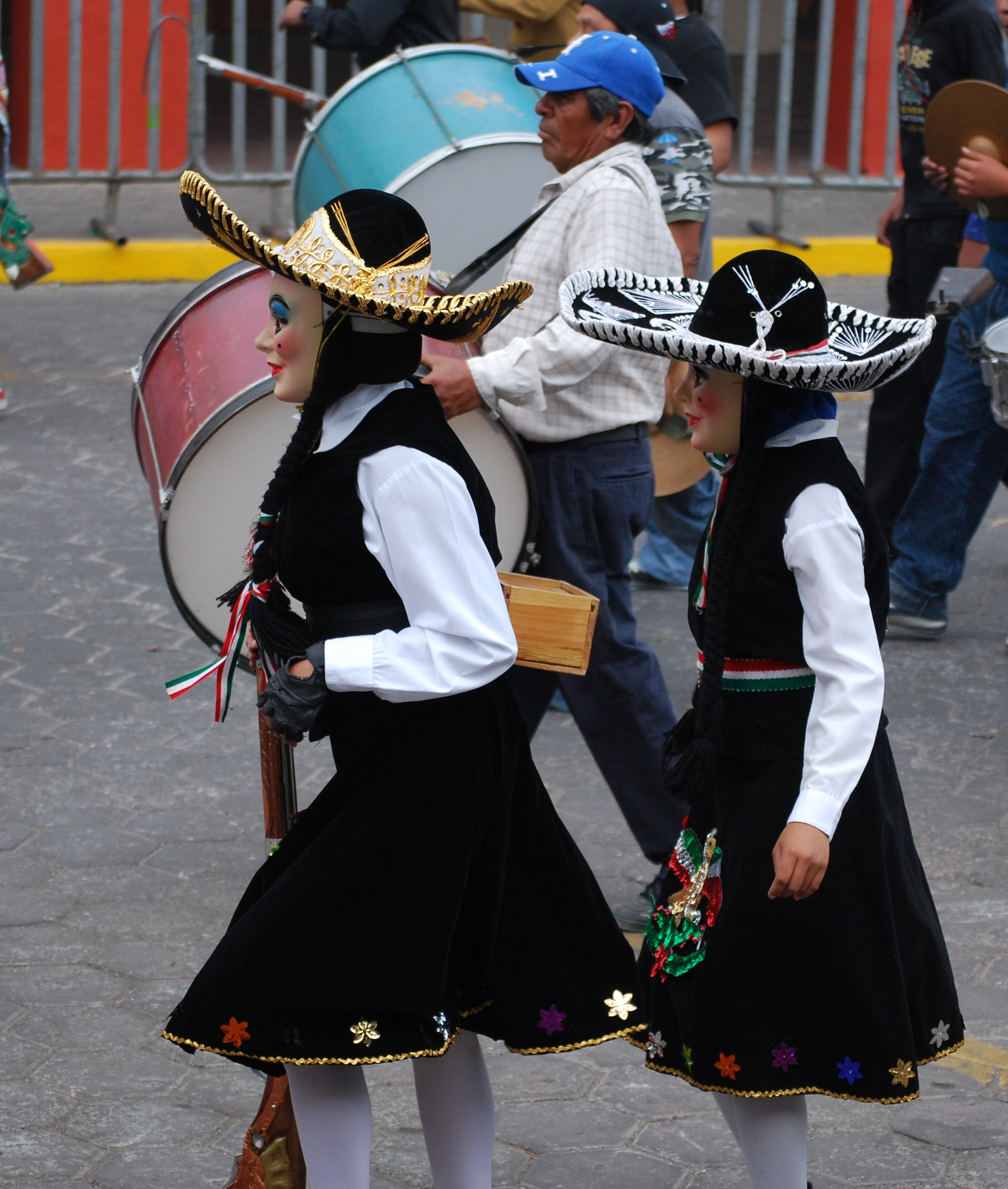
Zacapoaxtlas

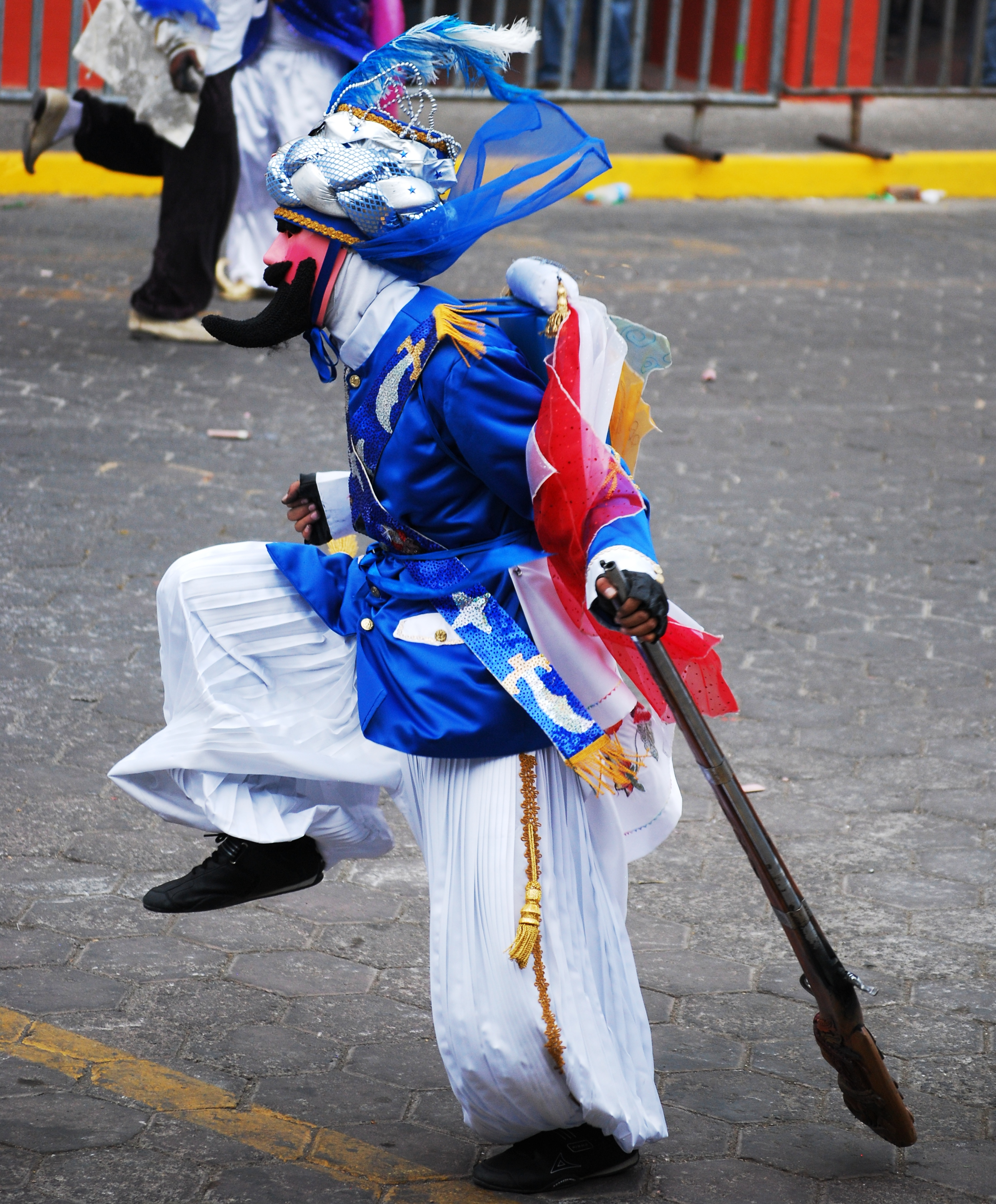
Turko

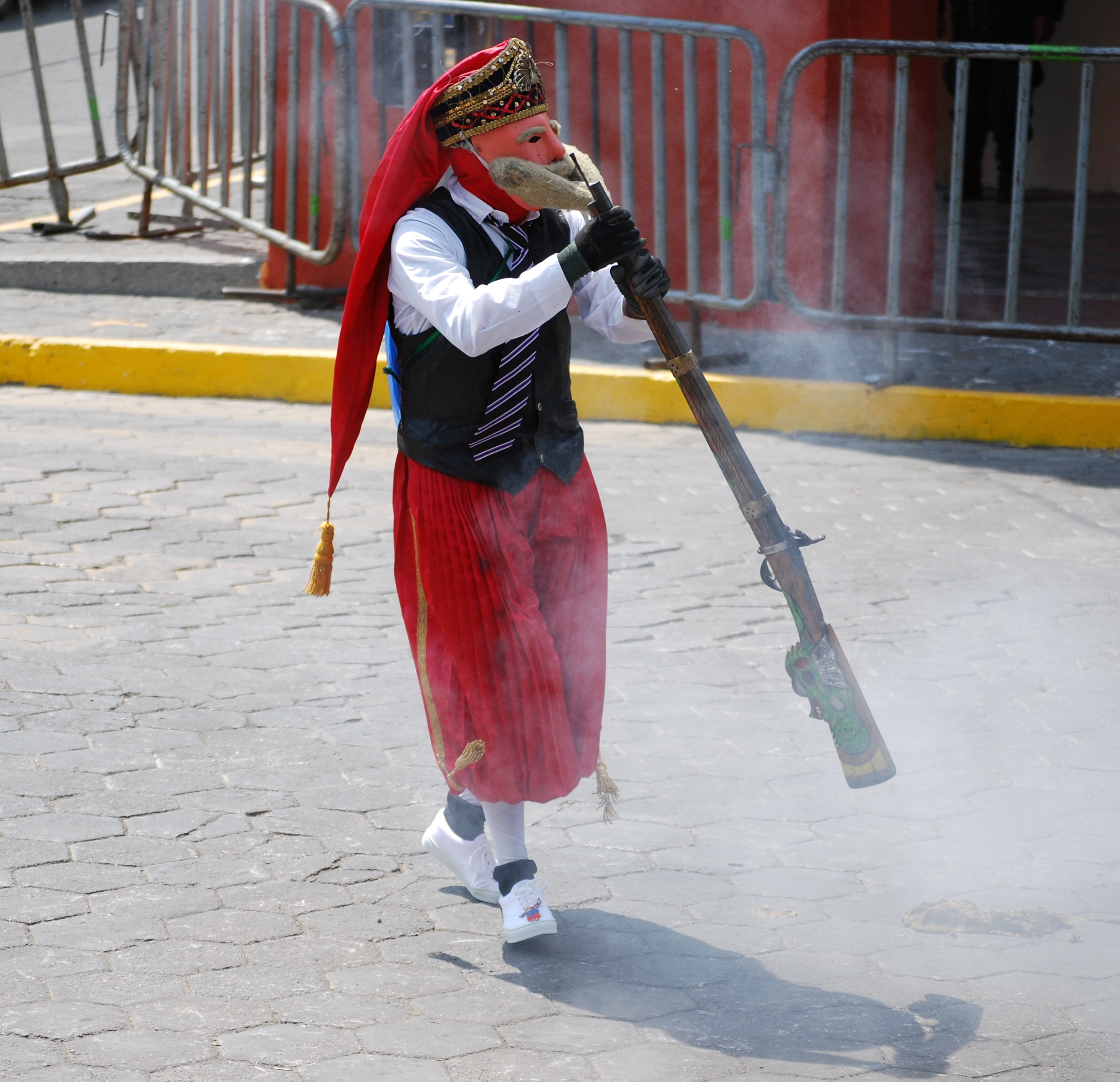
Zuavo

Each year there are about 12,000 costumed participants. Most of these belong to one of the seventeen battalions which represent of all of the municipality's major communities as well as the original four neighborhoods of the town of Huejotzingo. These battalions have between 100 and 800 people, who carry hand carved muskets and leather masks. Each battalion has its own live band and several general.

In 2013, the first women generals were elevated with Rosa María Castillo for the Zacapoaxtlas, Adriana Arroyo for the Zapadores, María de los Angeles Mendez and Maria Lomeli for the Indios and Fatima Bernaba for the Turcos. The muskets are for mock battles and other celebrating. They are used to set off real gunpowder but no bullets. Black gunpowder is used which is the most powerful and easy to ignite. The masks are handmade and include a beard. It is said that the hair for the beards used to be real human hair, often donated by female family members.

All soldier participants spend the four days in mock battles representing the Mexican side or the invading French army. When not fighting, they visit graves of former battalion members in the morning, hold a mass parade at midday and petition homes and businesses for their main meal in the mid afternoon. This last tradition harkens back to the payment of tribute in the pre Hispanic era. Costumes of the soldiers vary, valuing anywhere from 7,000 to over 30,000 pesos depending on the materials and complexity.

The seventeen battalions are further divided into five types of soldier-participants, based on costume style. These are called Zacapoaxtlas, Indios, Zapadores, Zuavos and Turks. The French imperial army consists of the Zuavos, Turcos and Zapadores. The Mexican army is mostly represented by the Indios Serranos and the Zacapoaxtlas.

The Zacapoaxtlas stand out because they have the most elaborate and costly costumes. They dress as charros, which suits heavily decorated in sequins, a wig with the colors of the Mexican flag and a black cape. Representing the troops of General Zaragoza in the Battle of Puebla, they wear green, white and red paper streamers that hang off the back of their hats. Their suits are elaborated embroidered and sequined which has been hand done. These outfits have been valued at about 30,000 and sometimes as high as 50,000 pesos.

The other main group is called “Indios Serranos” (Mountain Indians) or “Inditos” (Little Indians). They represent Huejotzingo's indigenous past but their costumes are a fusion of both indigenous and European influences. Their hats are traditionally made from palm fronds (although many now are made with a kind of plastic strip) which have the image of the Virgin of Guadalupe, the patroness of Mexico. They also carry an animal skin, preferably that of a cacomixtle in honor of the indigenous goddess Camaxtli, who was the patron of the region. Unlike the other groups, their masks are colored with an ochre tint.

The “Franceses” (French) or “Zuavos” represent a group of elite French troops at the Battle of Puebla, noted for their cruelty. They wear a blue cap decorated with stones, gold ribbons, sequined belts, leather masks, dark glasses and royal blue capes. They carry wooden boxes on their backs underneath which are the flags of France and Mexico. In the box there are soldiers’ provisions such as French bread, although many today put commercial sandwich bread in its place.

The “Zapadores” are those who represent those of the elite classes in Mexican society. They are dressed as the imperial guard of Maximilian I and some as the personal guard of Mexico's first emperor Agustín de Iturbide. Their outfits mix the national colors of both Mexico and France. They wear Spanish colonial style helmets made of black leather with the crest of Agustín de Iturbide, in remembrance of Mexico's independence. For similar reasons, they also wear ribbons of green, white and red of Mexico's current flag. These are the soldiers who protect the corregidor's daughter during the reenactment of her abduction.

The “Turcos” (Turks) are in reference to the Muslims against which the evangelists preached heavily in the early colonial period, although the Muslims in Spain were Moors rather than Turks. They are still considered an “enemy” to Mexico in popular imagination and are in this carnival. They are also considered to represent mercenaries from Egypt brought by Napoleon III . They are dressed with turbans or tall hats, silk clothing, and scimitars and with crescent moons and peacock feathers used as decorative elements. They also have silk capes embroidered with images of Mexican heroes. The Turkish battalions mostly consist of people who live in the four original neighborhoods of Huejotzingo.

== Other participants ==
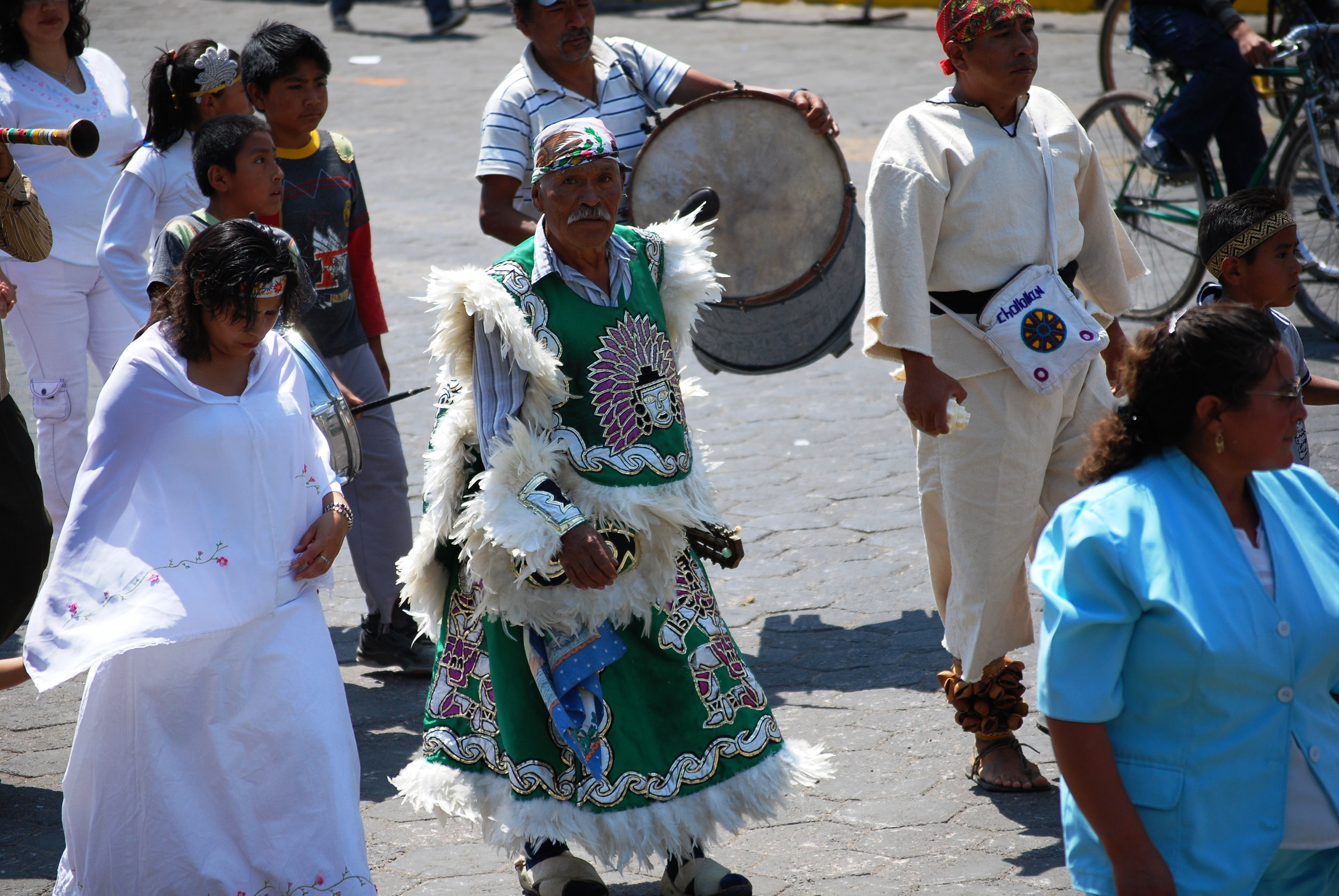
Members of an Apache group

In addition to the major soldier types there are other kinds of participants in carnival festivities. Negritos (Little Blacks) have only a red bandana and their faces painted black to distinguish them. They represent Mexicans of African descent which were brought to Mexico. Those who participate in the mock battles participate on the French side.

The “Apaches” wear costumes reminiscent of those of Aztec warriors and represent the origins of carnival in Huejotzingo. They fight on the Mexican side.

Another small group is the “Diablos” (Devils). They represent a community which is since disappeared, where it is said that the residents practiced witchcraft.

== History ==
The carnival began in 1868 only a few years after the Battle of Puebla in 1862. It is the oldest running carnival in the country. The festival was made famous by painters Diego Rivera, Desiderio Hernández Xochitiotzin and Fernando Ramírez Osorio who painted scenes from it.

The carnival's heavy use of volatile gunpowder has led to injuries and even deaths among participants and spectators, with the 2013 version using over five ton of gunpowder. In 2013, over one hundred were injured, about sixty five seriously, mostly burns from gunpowder. Despite the record number of injuries, organizers say it is not possible to ban alcohol or gunpowder as they are considered to be essential to the event.
