= Carnivals of Iztapalapa =

Coordinates: 19°21′26.16″N 99°5′31.21″W

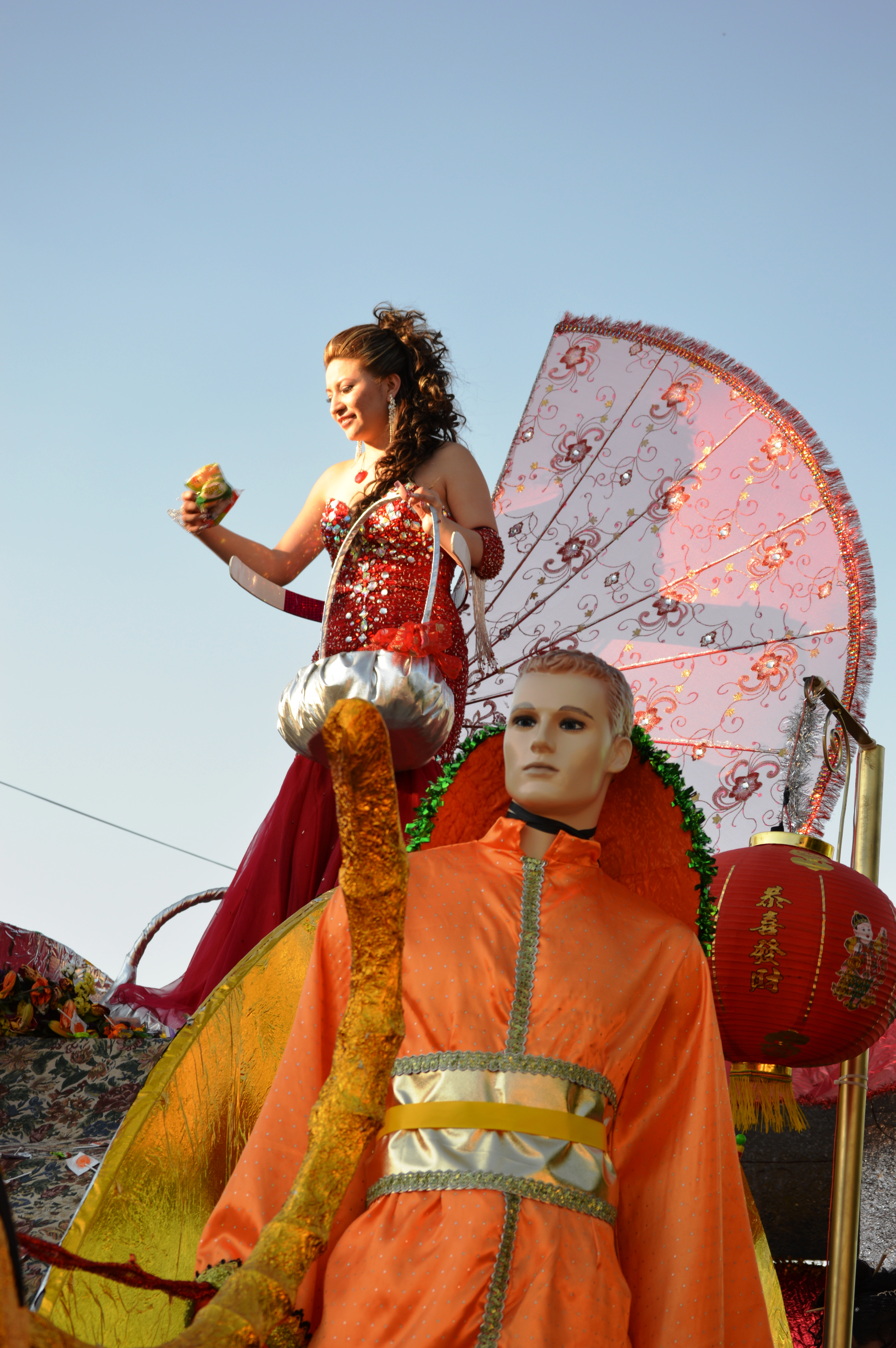
One of the carnival queens on parade in the neighborhood of Santa Maria Acatitla

The Carnivals of Iztapalapa are various Carnival celebrations in the Mexico City borough of Iztapalapa. They are what remain of Carnival celebrations brought to Mexico City by the Spanish but subsequently suppressed by Inquisition authorities. There are individual celebrations in various communities, but for the close of Carnival, these communities come together for an event that can draw up to 200,000 people.

== History ==
The tradition of Carnival was brought to Mexico by the Spanish, including to Mexico City. However the Mexican Inquisition, banned most of the traditions associated with it in Mexico City, forcing celebrations outside the historic center into what was the rural areas of the Valley of Mexico, including what is now the borough of Iztapalapa. However, these too were repressed around 1780. It went underground until after the Independence of Mexico and has since reappeared in various communities in Iztapalapa.

== Celebrations ==
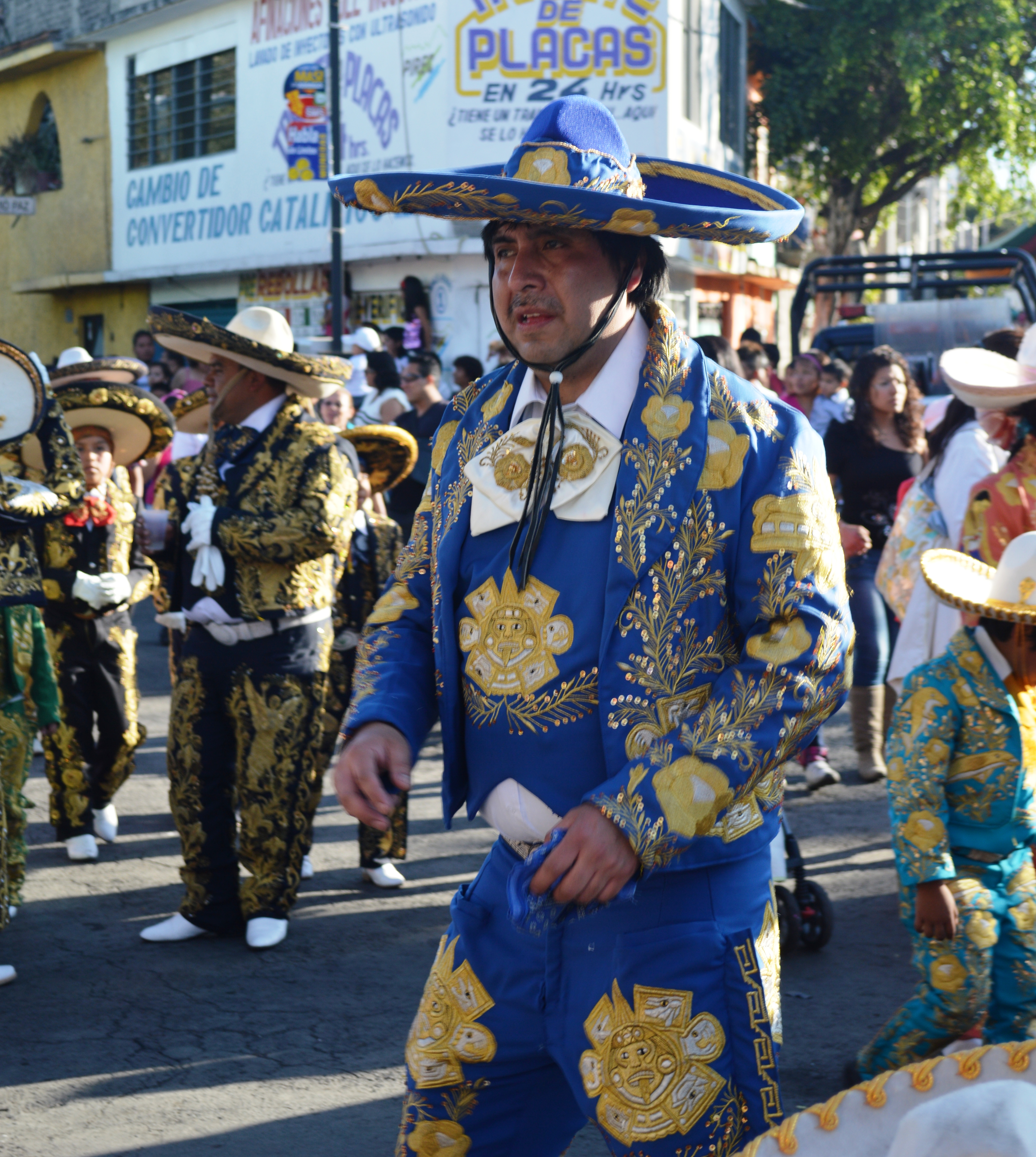
Charros in procession

Carnival is celebrated in various communities in the borough, especially the oldest ones. These include Pueblo Culhuacán, Santa Cruz Meyehualco, Santa María Aztahuacán, Santa Martha Acatitla, San Lorenzo Tezonco, San Sebastián Tecoloxtitlán, Santiago Acahualtepec, Santa María Tomatlán the historic center of Iztapalapa. The basic structure of Carnival celebrations are groups of dancers, most organized under the name of “comparsa” or krewe. As they dance in costume (either traditional costume such as charros or modern cartoon characters) they are accompanied by live bands that wander with them along the streets. Various queens are crowned by the groups and parade on floats. These are followed by various street parties with stages for bands set up on various streets.

One tradition related to carnival is “lunes de ahorcado” or Monday of the hanged. This is a play where a man playing a villain called a palegande is “hanged” for various supposed crimes, which includes someone who plays his “wife” accusing him of beating and abandoning her. Just before sentence, he is given a last wish, which is to dance a danzón. The communities come together for the close of event, which can draw up to 200,000 people.
