= Carnival in Mexico =

Annual celebration

Carnival in Mexico (Spanish: Carnaval) is celebrated by about 225 communities in various ways, with the largest and best known modern celebrations occurring in Mazatlán and the city of Veracruz.

Larger celebrations are also found in the Baja California and Yucatán Peninsulas, similar to other Carnivals with floats, queens and costumes but are not as large as those in Rio de Janeiro and New Orleans. Smaller and more rural communities have Carnival traditions which have conserved more of Mexico's indigenous and religious heritage and vary depending on the local indigenous cultures that Carnival was assimilated into. The largest of this kind is held in Huejotzingo, Puebla, with mock battles based on the Battle of Puebla and reenactments of stories. Other important Carnival variations can be found in Tlaxcala, Oaxaca, Chiapas, Jalisco, Morelos and some parts of Mexico City.

== History ==
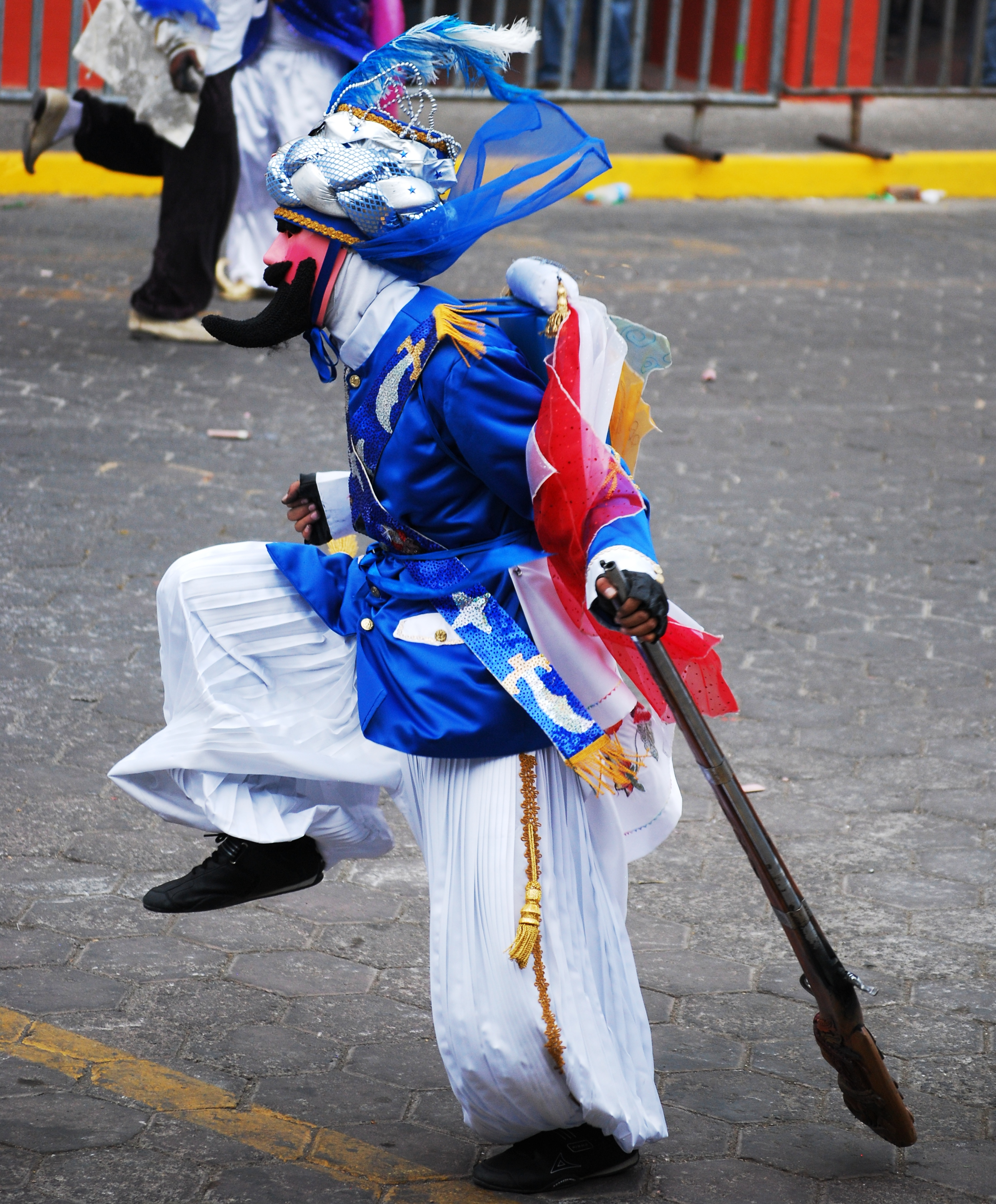
Participant dressed as a "Turk" for the Carnival of Huejotzingo, Puebla

Established in Europe, in the Middle Ages, Carnival came to Mexico with the Spanish and during the colonial period was celebrated in one form or another. Its acceptance among the indigenous population stemmed from the fact that it coincided with various indigenous festivals, such as Nemontemi for the Nahuas and Cabik for the Mayas, both of which refer to the "lost days" of the Mesoamerican calendar, when faces were covered to repel or confuse evil. Its popularity during the rest of the colonial period continued because it was one time when normal rules could be broken, especially with the use of masks to hide identities from the authorities.

In the eighteenth century, the crown made a concerted effort to suppress the excesses of carnival, banning the wearing of masks, forbidding laypeople to dress as clerics, forbidding cross dressing. Celebrations of carnival had been especially lively and drunken by Indians and castas. The authorities' toleration in the earlier colonial period was replaced by a repression of this period of social inversion and role reversal. Although there had been efforts to tamp down the festivities in the late seventeenth century, with the period under viceroy Don Juan de Acuña the measures finally seemed to take hold; "the viceroy stopped it in its tracks and it never recovered."

Public celebrations of Carnival waned in the 19th century after Mexico's independence and later Liberal movements discouraged it as an element of the country's colonial past. From the late 19th century to the early 20th, the festival as a major public event has made something of a comeback in areas such as Veracruz, northwestern Mexico and the Yucatán Peninsula. The large scale celebrations have mostly become divorced from their religious roots with commercialization in the latter 20th century. However, the numerous smaller celebrations in rural areas have maintained indigenous and religious elements, making its manifestation varied depending on which indigenous cultures the celebration melded.

The large modern celebrations have been sponsored by city governments as an important social and tourist event. In 2012 Veracruz allowed visitors to camp on the city's tourist beaches. However, they are not without problems or controversies. There are occasionally problems with disorderly conduct, excessive alcohol consumption and fighting in the streets. The Veracruz carnival has been criticized by Protestant/Evangelical Christian groups for moral reasons. Similarly the 2012 Carnival in Puerto Vallarta caused controversy. The committee responsible for it was fired as the event was criticized as "too sexual in content, too gay,…" For the 2013 Carnival, the Veracruz committee has decided to prohibit advertising for political candidates and parties.

== Major Carnivals ==
The two largest modern public Carnival celebrations in Mexico are in Veracruz and Mazatlán with other large celebrations in Baja California and the Yucatán Peninsulas which attract significant numbers of visitors mostly from within Mexico. Most of the larger carnivals start with the burning or condemning of an effigy called "mal humor" (bad mood), the election of a Carnival Queen and sometimes a King Momo, parades with floats (especially on the Sunday before Ash Wednesday), street parties and vendors and concerts by musicians playing popular and traditional musical styles. Costumes worn by participants vary including dressing as the opposite sex and parodies of political figures. Festivities go on until the early morning hours except on Tuesday, when Carnival ends.

=== Mazatlán ===
Mazatlán has the oldest major modern Carnival tradition in Mexico with a history of over a hundred years starting in 1898. The current version of the Mazatlan Carnival began in 1898 which is known as the "Carnavales de confeti y serpentina" (Carnivals of confetti and streamers), which replaced the "Carnavales de harina" (Carnivals of flour) where rivals groups, the "docks people" and the "warehouse people" staged mock battles with insults taunts and projectiles usually filled with flour. The aim of the modern version of Carnival was to replace this with something more orderly and less dangerous, focusing on a parade with lively costumes. In 1898 a civil committee organized the first citywide event, the first such in Mexico. The event was originally had at the Machado Plaza with procession of decorated cars and bicycles. The first Carnival queen was Wilfrida Farmer in 1900. However, projectiles are still thrown among those in the crowds, generally eggshells filled with confetti and spray cans of foam are also used.

Visitors to the event are almost all from Mexico. The Carnival has various main events which are designed to appeal to different groups of people, two parades, a street party with live music, two food festivals, selection of the royal court and concerts. All are organized by the city around a different theme each year. It is more family-oriented, less sexual than Rio de Janeiro's and more tranquil than that of New Orleans or Veracruz, but it occupies the city completely during its time. Mazatlan authorities stated in 2016 that they expected to see a 30~40% increase in prostitution for the Carnival of that year. During the Carnival of 2017, in an effort to combat the spread of sexually transmitted diseases, the state's Secretariat of Health distributed 80,000 condoms and performed rapid HIV tests. During the Carnival of 2019, an alert was raised concerning the arrival of fentanyl to the streets. In February 2020, days before the Carnival of that year, Rosa E. Sánchez Moraila, director of the city's Youth Integration Center, stated that the greatest excess in the consumption of alcohol and other drugs, both licit and illicit, occurs during the celebration of the Carnival.

The preferred music for the Carnival goes according to local tastes: banda, grupera, sinaloense, mariachi, chirrines and other danceable musical styles are commonly heard. More recently, since the mid-2010s, there has been an increase in the use of EDM, reggaeton and trap music. There are also cultural events. Carnival days are official holidays in the city, with parties lasting nearly all night. The main festivities are now held at the Paseo de Olas Altas and at the Claussen next to the ocean, both of which are closed to traffic on these days and fill with about 60,000 people each night. While it officially begins on Thursday, the main activities begin on Friday and culminate on Tuesday night. Prior to this there are campaigns for Carnival King and Queen, the Juegos Flores and the contest for Rey Feo (ugly king). There is a children's version of Mazatlán's carnival, which has many of the same elements such as the selection of a queen, but avoids the excesses. This was begun in the 1920s.

=== Veracruz ===
The modern version of Carnival in the city of Veracruz is not as old as Mazatlan's but it is larger, lasting nine days with six major parades with floats along with large public concerts, parties and special events and promotion in just about all the city's restaurants, bars and nightclubs. Carnival in Veracruz has its origins in the colonial period. Residents in neighborhoods just outside the city wall created new forms of music from European, African and indigenous traditions. The original major festival for these communities was Corpus Christi but eventually it shifted to Carnival. These early 18th century Carnival traditions with people in colorful costumes dancing to African-derived chuchumbé rhythms provoked the disapproval of church officials. Despite this, the festival continued to evolve in the 19th into formal balls for the elite as well as street celebrations for the city's popular classes. Many of these events were held over a two-week period before Ash Wednesday. The celebrations were severely regulated and restricted during the French Intervention in Mexico.

In the late 19th century, Liberals decided it was a vestige of colonialism and sought to eliminate it which made celebration of the event a private affair among the wealthy.

After the Mexican Revolution, carnival was re initiated in 1925 with a committee sponsored by the Alianza de Ferrocarrileros, the first citywide celebration of the event in about fifty years. The purpose of this was to promote community unity and post Revolution social values such as the breaking down of socioeconomic barriers. The first Carnival queen was Lucha Raigadas and the first Rey Feo (Ugly King) was Carlos Puig "Papiano" selected in 1926. The first children's queen was selected in 1942. Floats appeared for the first time in 1945 and was the first night parade in the city ever. The Veracruz Carnival tradition has since spread to the neighboring Tuxpan, which attracts about 50,000 visitors held at the city's fairgrounds each year.

Today, Veracruz has the largest and best known Carnival in Mexico beginning with the "quema del mal humor" or the burning of bad mood and ending with the burial of "Juan Carnival." The quema de mal humor is represented by an effigy of a disliked famous person, either Mexican or foreign. Juan Carnival is another effigy which receives a mock funeral. In between there are the coronation of the Carnival Queen and her court, six parades with a minimum of thirty floats each that run between Veracruz and Boca del Río, dances, concerts by well-known artists which have included Enrique Iglesias, Espinoza Paz, Paulina Rubio and Cristian Castro and charity events.

=== Other major Carnivals ===
In the Baja California Peninsula, the two main Carnival celebrations occur in Ensenada and La Paz. The Ensenada Carnival extends over six days and consists of the quema del mal humor, dances, parades with floats, a royal court and more. It is one of the most important tourist events in northwestern Mexico attracting about 300,000 visitors including many from California. It has had performances by Joan Sebastián, Alejandra Guzmán, Magneto, Caló, Polo Polo and others. The modern La Paz Carnival was begun in 1898, making it one of the oldest in the country. Before that, celebration of Carnival was limited to formal affairs at the houses of the rich. It includes concerts such as those by Espinoza Paz, Sonora Santanera and Ha*Ash.

On the Yucatán Peninsula, major Carnival celebrations are held in Mérida, Cozumel and the city of Campeche. Mérida celebrates Carnival for a full week with various events, including a parade held at the fairgrounds at Xmatkuil. The preferred music for this time is the mambo, cha-cha-cha and cumbia. Here, mal humor has been represented by effigies of Bill Clinton, Hillary Clinton, Ernesto Zedillo, his wife Nilda Patricia Velasco and various journalists. Sometimes these reference serious problems such as drug trafficking and corruption. A common costume is that of Momo, the Greek god of jokes and pranks. One local tradition is youth tossing flowers, confetti and even eggshells filled with flour or indigo which dyes the person who is hit blue. Cozumel also celebrates for a week with parades, dance, costumes, music and street fairs with almost all work stopping for the event. Schools, clubs and community organizations spend weeks making floats, costumes and practicing dance and music performances, with the groups competing against each other. For the Carnival in Campeche, women wear outfits called trajes de mestiza and carry trays with a pig's head decorated with ribbons and dance to a style of music called Jarana. Another event is the "guerra de pinturas" in which all ages paint the face and body in various bright colors. The Campeche carnival also has a side festival called El Corso Infantil where children dress in costume and run the streets singing and dancing tropical music.

== Local and regional Carnival celebrations ==
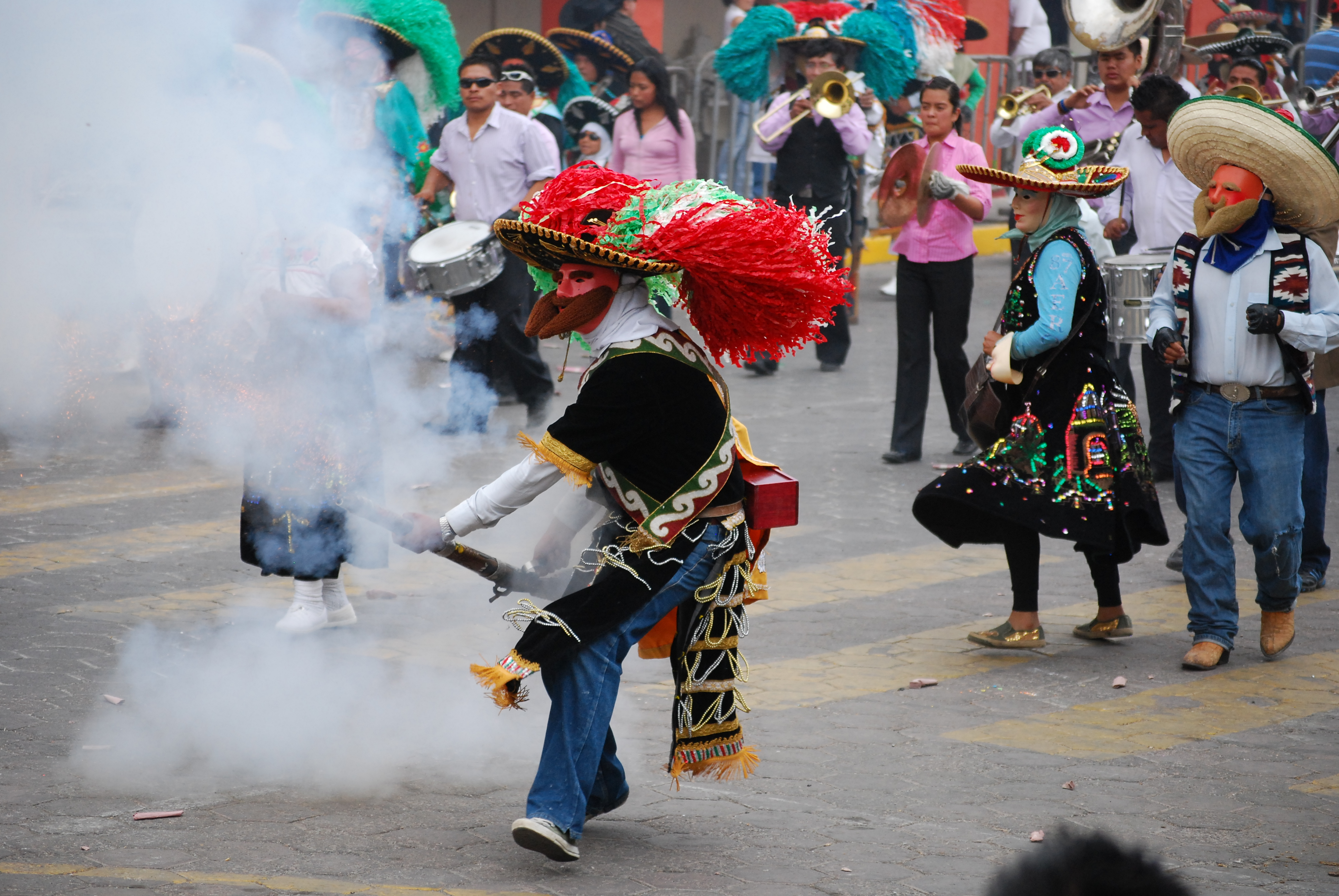
Participant dressed as a "Zacapoaxtla" at the carnival in Huejotzingo, Puebla

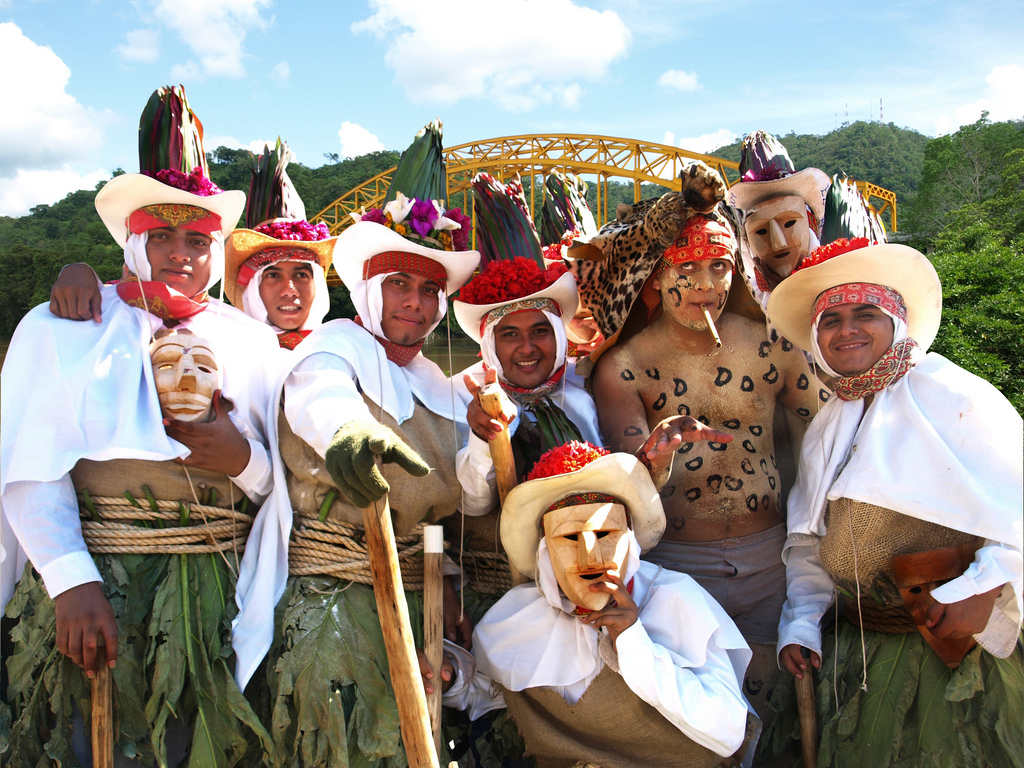
Los Pochos dancers from Carnival in Tenosique, Tabasco

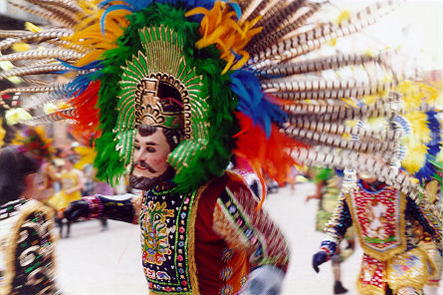
"Huehue" from Tlacuilohcan, Tlaxcala

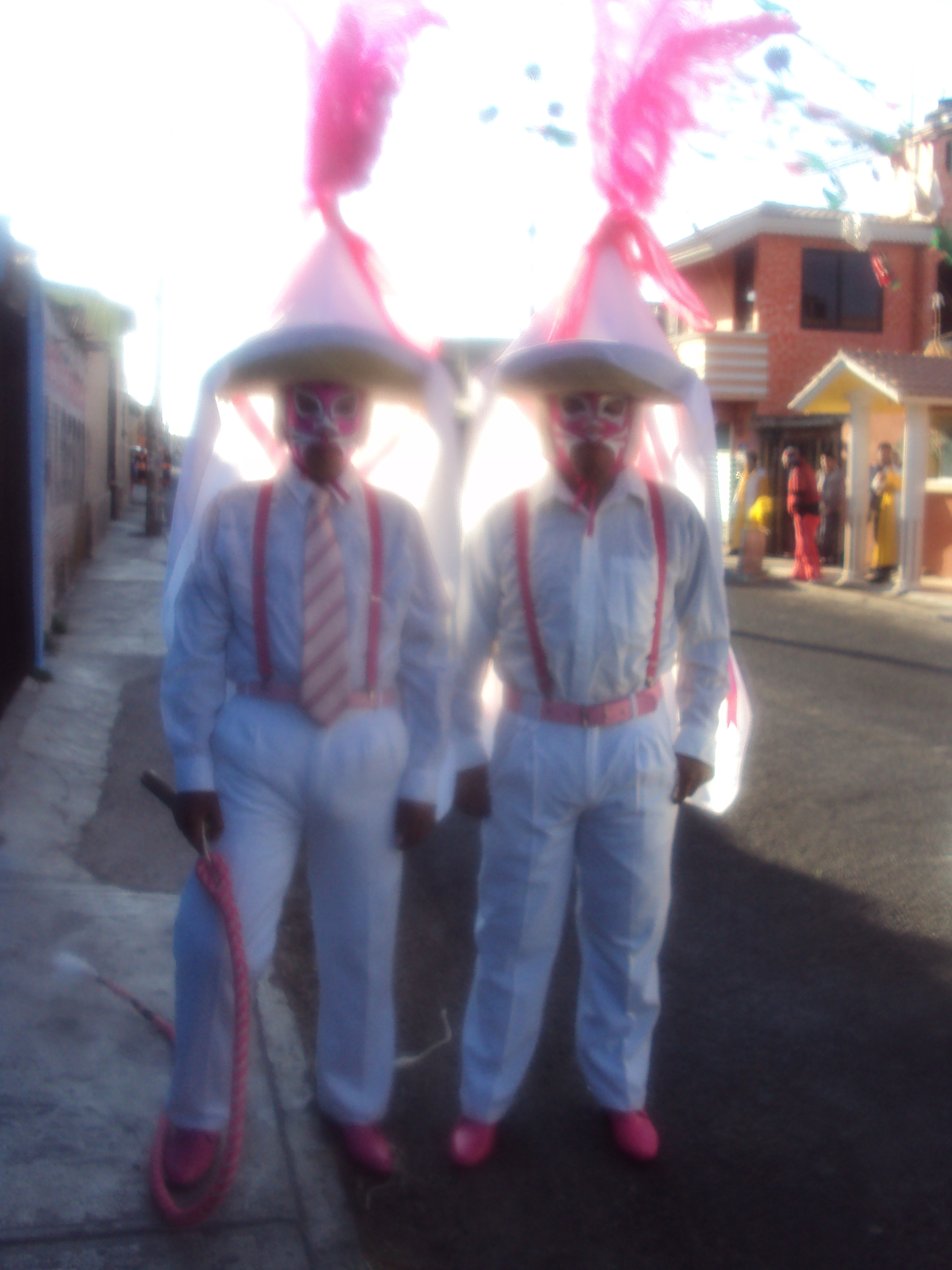
Participants in costume at the Carnival in Tenancingo, State of Mexico.

In total, Carnival is a significant even in about 225 communities in Mexico, many of these, especially in the smaller communities maintain elements from Mexico's religious and indigenous heritage. These celebrations vary widely often with traditional dance and regional music and ceremonies with both pagan and Christian origins. They may also contain modern elements such as floats as well as local sports and cultural events such as bullfighting, fishing tournaments and charreada /jaripeo.

One of the largest of this type of Carnival is the Carnival of Huejotzingo, Puebla in which over 2,000 people participate. Participants divide into four battalions, identified by costume. From the first day, the air is filled with the sounds of blanks being fired as mock battles among the battalions are enacted with fake guns using real gunpowder. The inspiration for much of the dance is the Battle of Puebla with Mexicans and French represented but it is not historically accurate. Also part of the festivities are the reenactment of two stories, one of the kidnapping of the mayor's daughter and one depicting the first Christian marriage in Mexico. Another significant Carnival event in the state is in Tehuacán where masked men called Huegues whip themselves in preparation for Lent.

While the Carnival in the city of Veracruz is thoroughly modern, those celebrated in north of the state are much more traditional, including elements such as prayers for good crops and the well-being of the community. Rural Veracruz carnivals near Xalapa feature various people in bull costumes, which often have elaborate wood masks. These persons use canes, large decorated capes and flowered headdresses. Some of the notable celebrations in the Totonacapan area include those of Ojite de Matamoros, Solteros de Juan Rosas and Arroyo Florido. In Ojite de Matamoros, men dress as women, priests, doctors and hunchbacks and perform a dance that recalls the struggles between the indigenous and the Spanish. These festivities last about fifteen days ending with a rite called the "corta-gallo" which involved the sacrifice of a number of fowl. In Arroyo Florido the festival is dedicated to the Devil considered to be the owner of all earthly goods. In Solteros de Juan Rosas the festival is only four days and includes a ceremony to bless the masks that the dancers wear. In all of these celebrations the preferred music is traditional Son and Huapango.

The celebration of Carnival is widespread in the state of Tlaxcala lasting anywhere from three days to a week depending on local tradition.

One of the better known Carnivals in Hidalgo is in Calnali in the La Huasteca Region. Events generally consist of dancing on the street in costume accompanied by traditional bands playing wind instruments. The four main neighborhoods of the municipality compete against each other in dance and for best costume with people dressing as monkeys, death, devils, women and even extraterrestrials and many more. One unique costume to the area is the Cuernudo, which is a mix between a monkey and a devil.

Carnival celebrations in the state of Morelos are generally family-oriented affairs. The best known Carnival in the state of Morelos is in Tlayacapan, noted for its Chinelos dancers. This dance was created as a way for the indigenous to ridicule their Spanish overlords. Other communities with significant Carnival celebrations include Jiutepec, Emiliano Zapata, Xochitepec, Tlaltizapán, Tepoztlán and Yautepec.

The Carnival of Pinotepa de Don Luis in the state of Oaxaca is notable for its use of satire especially related to matrimony and sometimes divorce using a dance called Tejorones. Costumes include various masks, depictions animals such as doves, and tiger hunts. Those in the tiger costume use mirrors for eyes. In Silacayoapan in the same state, the celebration began very simply. Dancers, restricted to men, dressed and use charcoal as make up to look like this coastal area's Afro Mexican population. If masks were used, they are simple structures made from gourds or maguey fronds. Since the latter 20th century on the celebration has evolved with a greater variety of costumes include men dressed as women, devils etc. Carnival always ends with a mock battle in the central plaza between two rival neighborhoods called Guadalupe and La Loma, throwing fruit and dried seeds. The music is a local variety of the Chilena Costeña. In the Mixteca Baja, Carnival is called Joc-lo which runs for three days ending with the "quema del gallo" (burning of the rooster). The traditional instruments for this event is the violin and a guitar called the bajo sexton for traditional songs such as El mecate, El son grande, El son chico, El torito and La cruz. Dances are done by men in costume, especially on the Sunday before Ash Wednesday generally as old men or as women. There has been some influence from modern carnivals and culture such as the appearance of costumes of North American origin. One town in this region particularly noted for its Joc-lo is San Jerónimo Xayacatlan.

The Carnivals of San Juan Chamula and Huistán in Chiapas involve the participation of most of the population, many of whom dress as monkeys adorned in multicolored ribbons. In Huistán they are accompanied by music from a twelve stringed guitar.

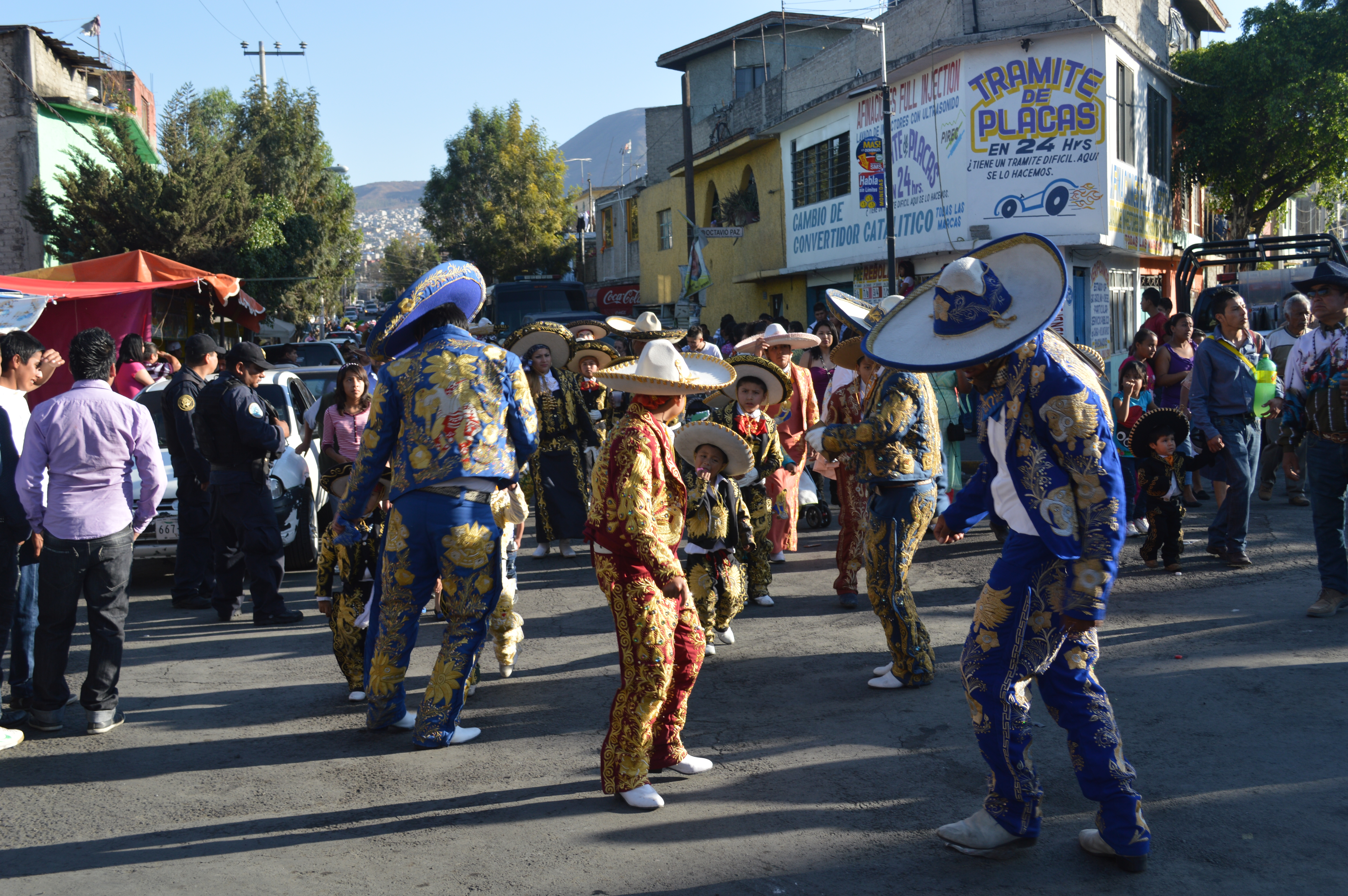
Charro dancers in Santa Marta Acatitla, Iztapalapa, Mexico City

The largest Carnival celebration in Tabasco is in the municipality of Tenosique with hundreds of people wind up covered in flour, egg and water from projectiles thrown at each other. The festival also consists of traditional dances such as El Pochó and Los Blanquitos, both with long histories. Another particular characteristic is that Carnival is considered to begin on January 20, the feast day of Saint Sebastian.

The best known Carnival celebrations in Jalisco are in Autlan, Ameca, Tecolotlán and Sayula. They last anywhere from three to ten days and include events such as concerts, bullfights, charrería and dances. In Sayula the main event is a friendly game between the professional Chivas against a local squad. In Barra de Navidad, there is a night procession of people with torches as well as a fishing contest and parade with floats.

The Cora people in Nayarit celebrate by painting their bodies with white spots and with traditional dances.

Mexico City does not have any major Carnival celebrations but various communities in the Iztapalapa borough do have events. One is cosponsored by the formerly rural communities of Santa Cruz Meyehualco, San Andrés Tetepilco, San Andrés Tomatlán, Santa María Tomatlán, San Sebastián Tecoloxtitlán and Santiago Acahualtepec. Another is sponsored by the eight neighborhoods of the historic town of Iztapalapa, as well as events in Los Reyes Culhuacán and San Lorenzo Tezonco. The origins of these festivities go back to the celebration of spring in the pre Hispanic period, but today they are mostly celebrated like those of the major carnivals, with elected queens, costumes and parades with floats.
