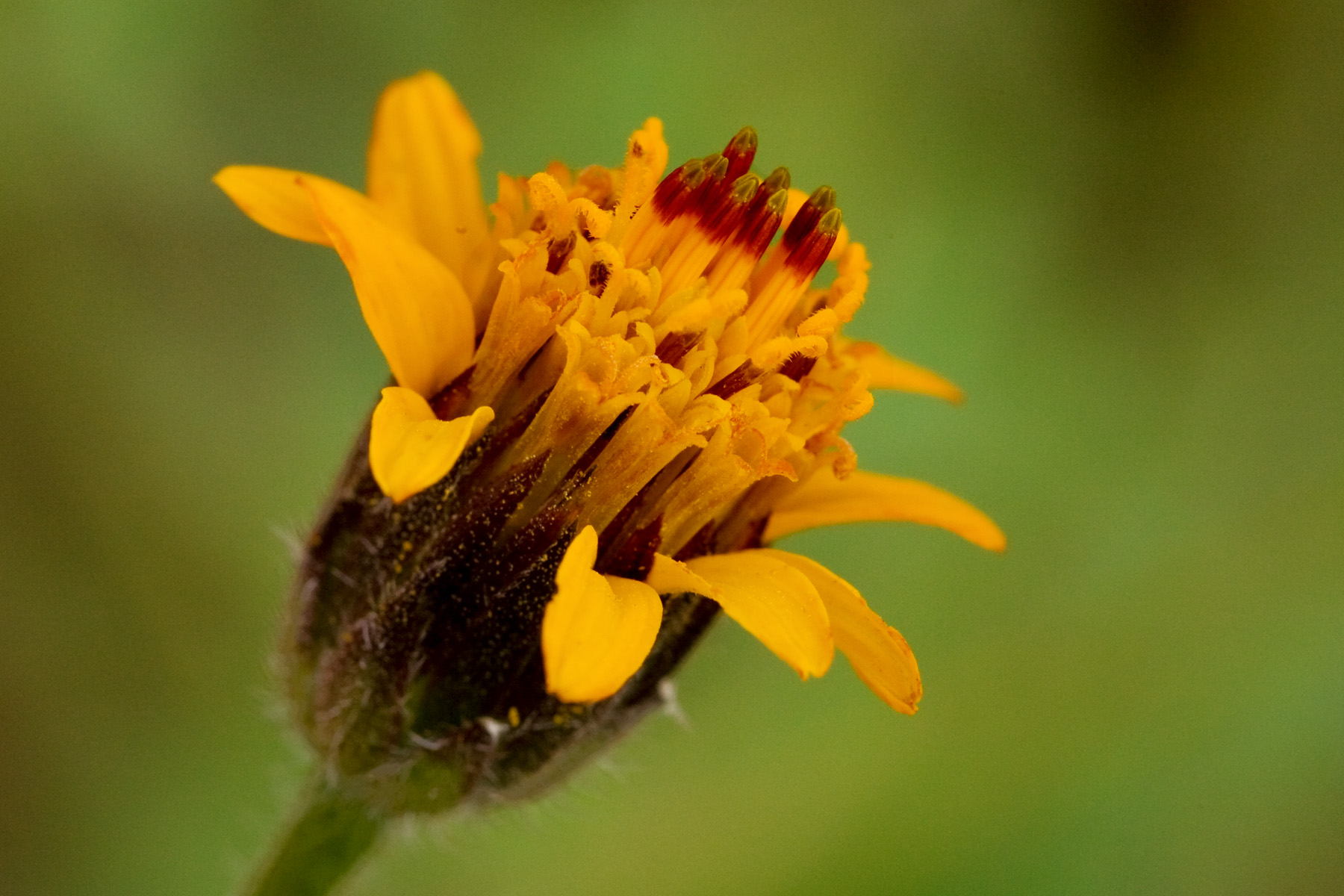
- Close-up of flower
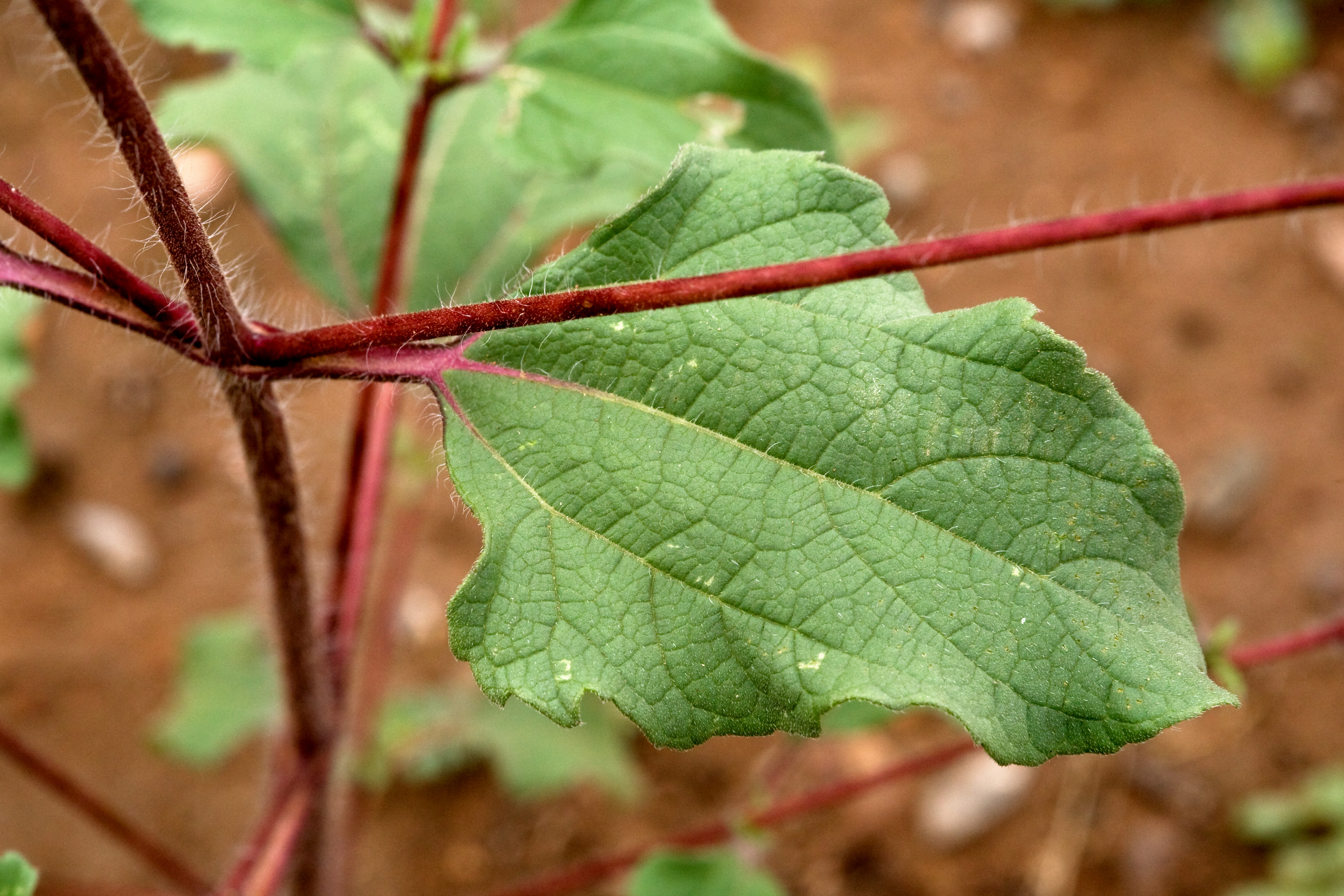
- Stem and leaves

Scientific classification
- Kingdom: Plantae
- Clade: Tracheophytes
- Clade: Angiosperms
- Clade: Eudicots
- Clade: Asterids
- Order: Asterales
- Family: Asteraceae
- Genus: Simsia
- Species: S. lagasceiformis

Binomial name
- Simsia lagasceiformis DC.

Synonyms
- List: Encelia exaristata A.Gray ex Hemsl.; Encelia lagasceiformis (DC.) A.Gray ex Hemsl.; Encelia pilosa Greenm.; Encelia purpurea Rose; Simsia exaristata A.Gray; Simsia exaristata var. epapposa S.F.Blake; Simsia exaristata var. perplexa S.F.Blake

= Simsia lagasceiformis =

Species of plant

Simsia lagasceiformis, the annual bush sunflower, is a species of flowering plant in the family Asteraceae. It is native to seasonally dry tropical areas of Arizona, New Mexico, Texas, Mexico, and Guatemala, and it has been introduced to Maryland. It is typically an annual, and can grow to be 13 ft (4 m) tall.
