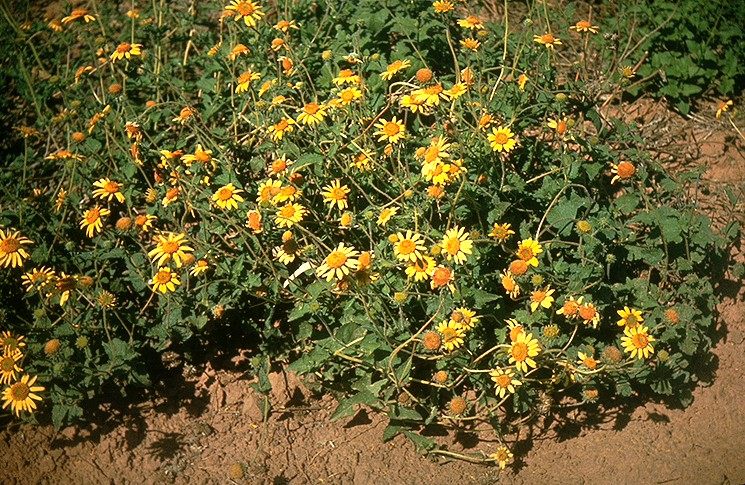

Conservation status
- Secure (NatureServe)

Scientific classification
- Kingdom: Plantae
- Clade: Tracheophytes
- Clade: Angiosperms
- Clade: Eudicots
- Clade: Asterids
- Order: Asterales
- Family: Asteraceae
- Genus: Simsia
- Species: S. calva

Binomial name
- Simsia calva A.Gray

= Simsia calva =

Species of plant

Simsia calva, commonly known as the awnless bushsunflower, is a perennial or subshrub that is found in the Southwest United States (Texas and New Mexico), as well as Mexico, the West Indies, and both Central and South America.

== Description ==
Plants in the genus Simsia consist of annuals, perennials and subshrubs, ranging from anywhere between 20–400 centimeters (8–157 in) in height with stems that are either fully erect or ascending. Of the Simsia calva species, the average height ranges from 30–150 cm (12–59 in). The leaves are cauline in their arrangement and can be proximal or whorled. The petioles are winged and usually form what are considered "discs" when they occasionally fuse with one another at the base. The faces of the leaves are hirsute to scabro-hispid, and are gland-dotted for the most part. The leaves of S. calva are dilated at the bases, forming fused "discs" with ovate blades measuring 2–8 cm (0.8–3.1 in) by 1.5–6 cm (0.6–2.4 in), and even 3-lobed at times.

The head of most, if not all, Simsia plants, including S. calva are radiate, and are either single, or in groups of two or three heads to form what is known as a corymb.

The peduncles of Simsia calva rival the length of the base length of the entire plant, nearing around 30 cm (12 in) at their largest, and 3 cm (1.2 in) at their smallest. A whorl of involucral bracts are campanulate and range between 5–22 mm (0.20–0.87 in) in Simsia, and 10 mm × 7 mm (0.39 in × 0.28 in) to 12 mm × 16 mm (0.47 in × 0.63 in). The bract below the flower, or phyllary, are around 11–66 in number and can either be condensed or broad. In Simsia calva, the phyllaries are around 21-43 and are arranged subequally to equal.

Simsia have receptacles that tend to be low convex and paleate, essentially having a scaly covering.

Ray florets are essentially the colorful, flowery portion of the plant. In most Simsia, the amount of ray florets can be anywhere between non-existent and as many as 45. They vary in colors, being any mixture of orange-yellow, lemon-yellow, pink, purple, or white. Simsia calva tend to have 8-21 ray florets with their colors being orange-yellow, with traces, lining, or fully colored faces of brown or purple.

Disc florets in the overall genus can range anywhere from 12 to 172 in quantity, however, in contrast to ray florets, disc florets are actually fertile, and bisexual as well. Their colors differ on each part of the floret (i.e., the anthers are black or yellow, and the corollas are the same color as the ray florets). In S. calva, the dis florets are enumerated from around 90–154, with the anthers almost always yellow, scarcely black.

Cypselae are fruits in the Simsia plants that are from inferior ovaries. They tend to be flattened and occasionally hairy. In S. calva, the cypselae are around 4 – 6 mm. In connection with the fruit structures, pappi surround the fruits. Generally absent in Simsia plants, they are either absent or very fine (4 mm) in S. calva as well.

== Habitat ==
Simsia calva flowers year round in various soils, ranging from sand to clay, and even harder surfaces such as within rocks, on limestone, in prairies, in various types of pine forests, and even along streams and roadsides.

In addition to the habitat that it may live in, S. calva also supports other members of the ecosystem it implements itself within. For large mammals, primarily, the species serves as a food source, albeit it would be a very small factor within a large mammal's diet, such as the white-tailed deer.

== Range ==
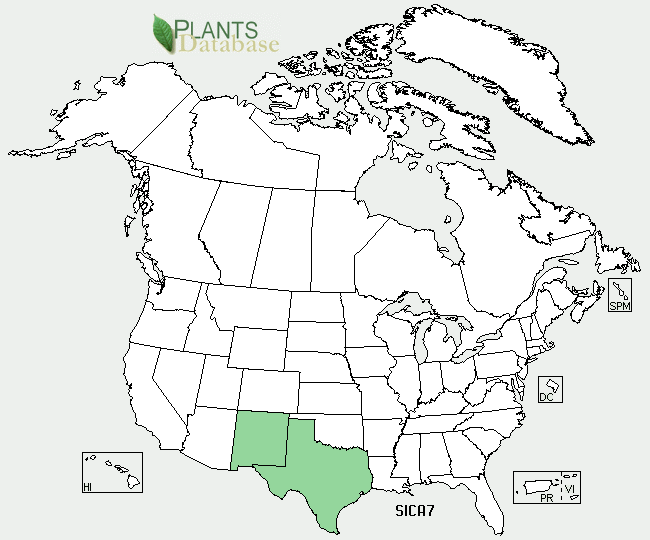
Locations of S. calva in the United States of America.

In the United States, Simsia calva is prominent throughout Texas, through the trans-Pecos mountains, and leading into New Mexico's southeastern portion.
