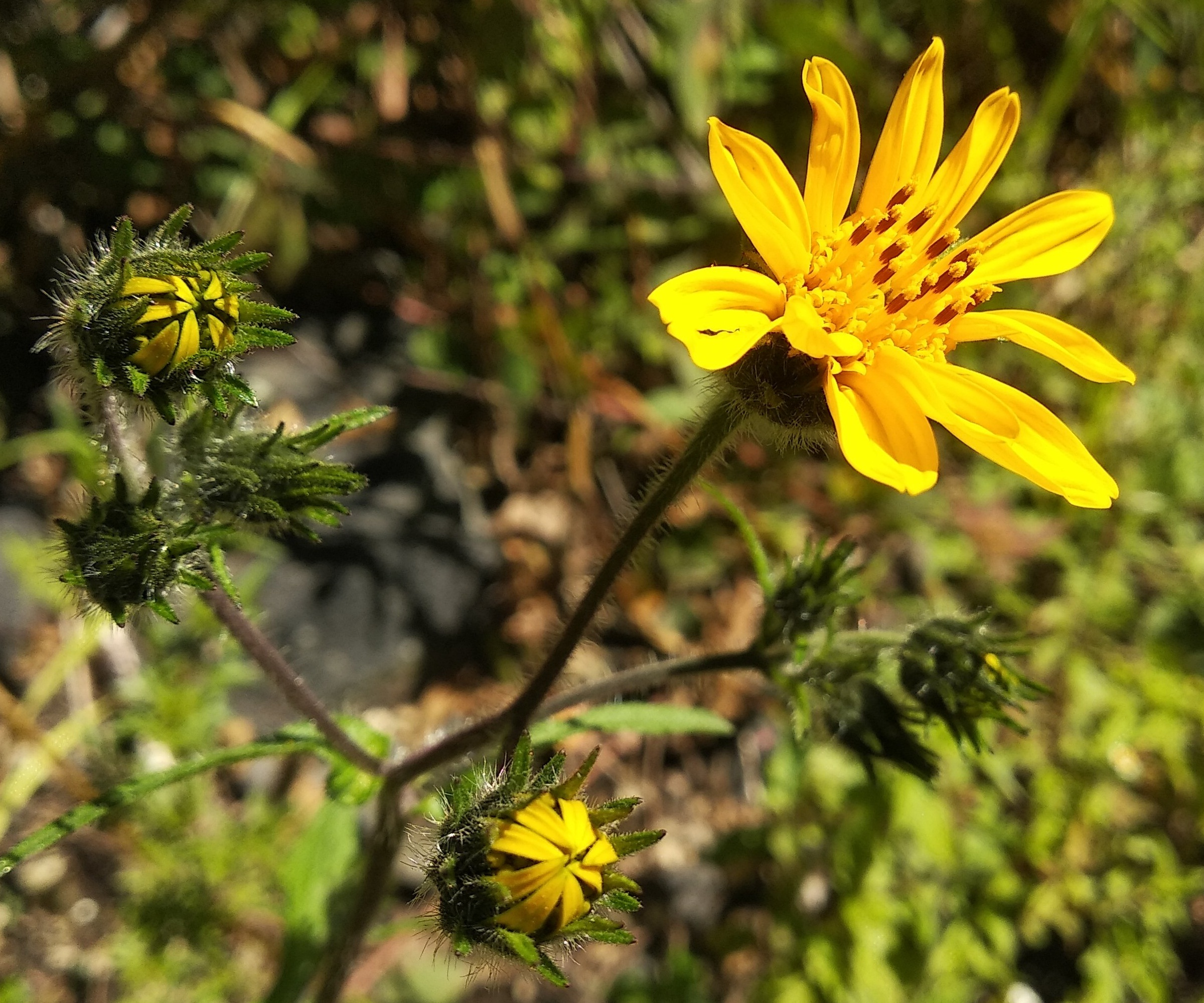
- Flowers
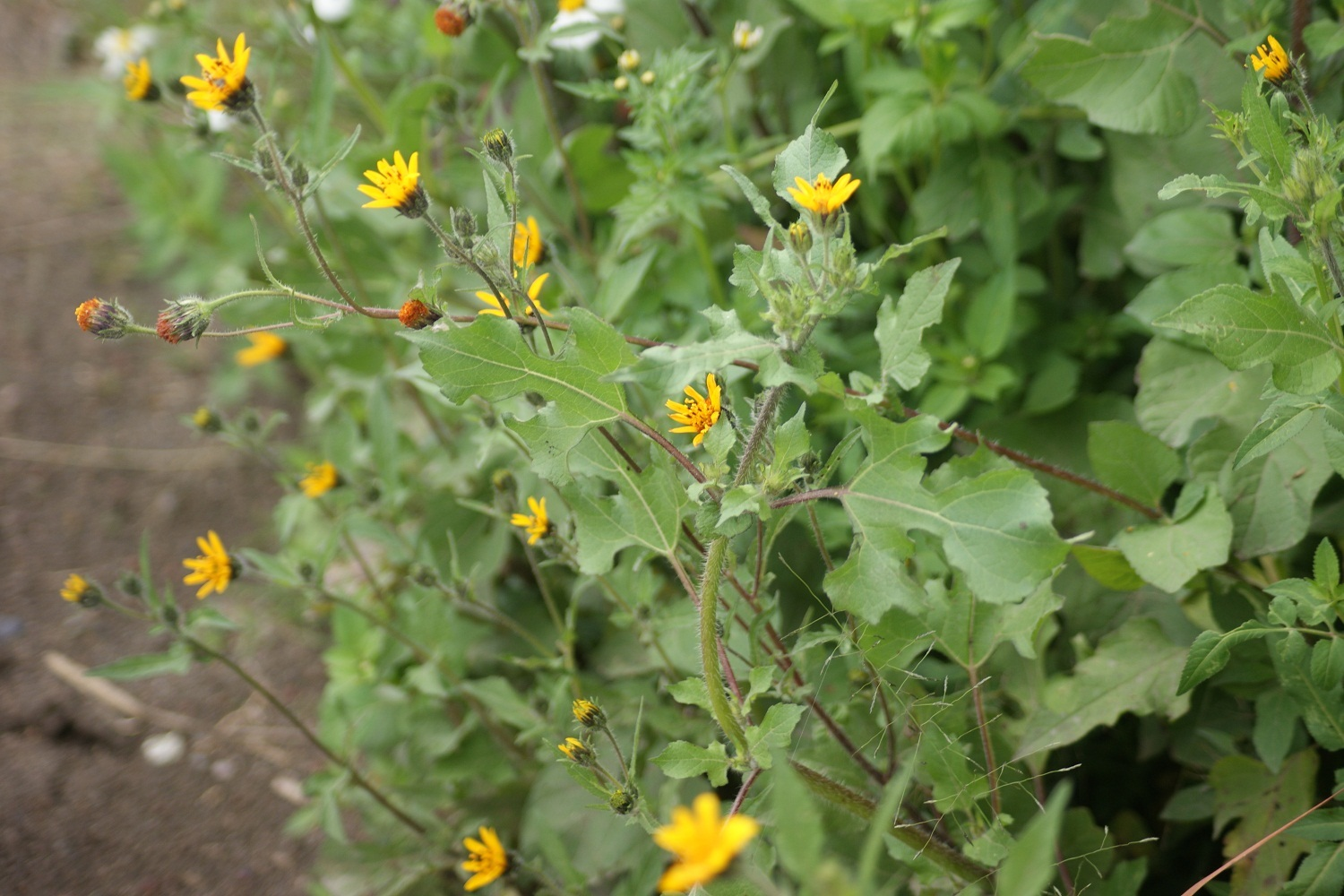
- Habit

Scientific classification
- Kingdom: Plantae
- Clade: Tracheophytes
- Clade: Angiosperms
- Clade: Eudicots
- Clade: Asterids
- Order: Asterales
- Family: Asteraceae
- Genus: Simsia
- Species: S. amplexicaulis

Binomial name
- Simsia amplexicaulis (Cav.) Pers.

Synonyms
- List: Coreopsis amplexicaulis Cav.; Encelia amplexicaulis (Cav.) Hemsl.; Encelia cordata (Kunth) Hemsl.; Encelia heterophylla (Kunth) Hemsl.; Encelia mexicana Mart. ex DC.; Helianthus amplexicaulis (Cav.) DC.; Helianthus sericeus Sessé & Moc.; Helianthus trilobatus Link; Simsia amplexicaulis var. decipiens (S.F.Blake) S.F.Blake; Simsia amplexicaulis var. genuina S.F.Blake; Simsia auriculata DC.; Simsia cordata (Kunth) Cass.; Simsia foetida var. decipiens S.F.Blake; Simsia heterophylla (Kunth) DC.; Simsia kunthiana Cass.; Ximenesia cordata Kunth; Ximenesia heterophylla Kunth; Ximenesia hirta Mart. ex DC.

= Simsia amplexicaulis =

Species of plant

Simsia amplexicaulis is a species of flowering plant in the family Asteraceae, native to Mexico, Guatemala, and Honduras. It is a common weed of cultivation.
