= Mexican mask-folk art =

Use of masks for traditional ceremonies in Mexico

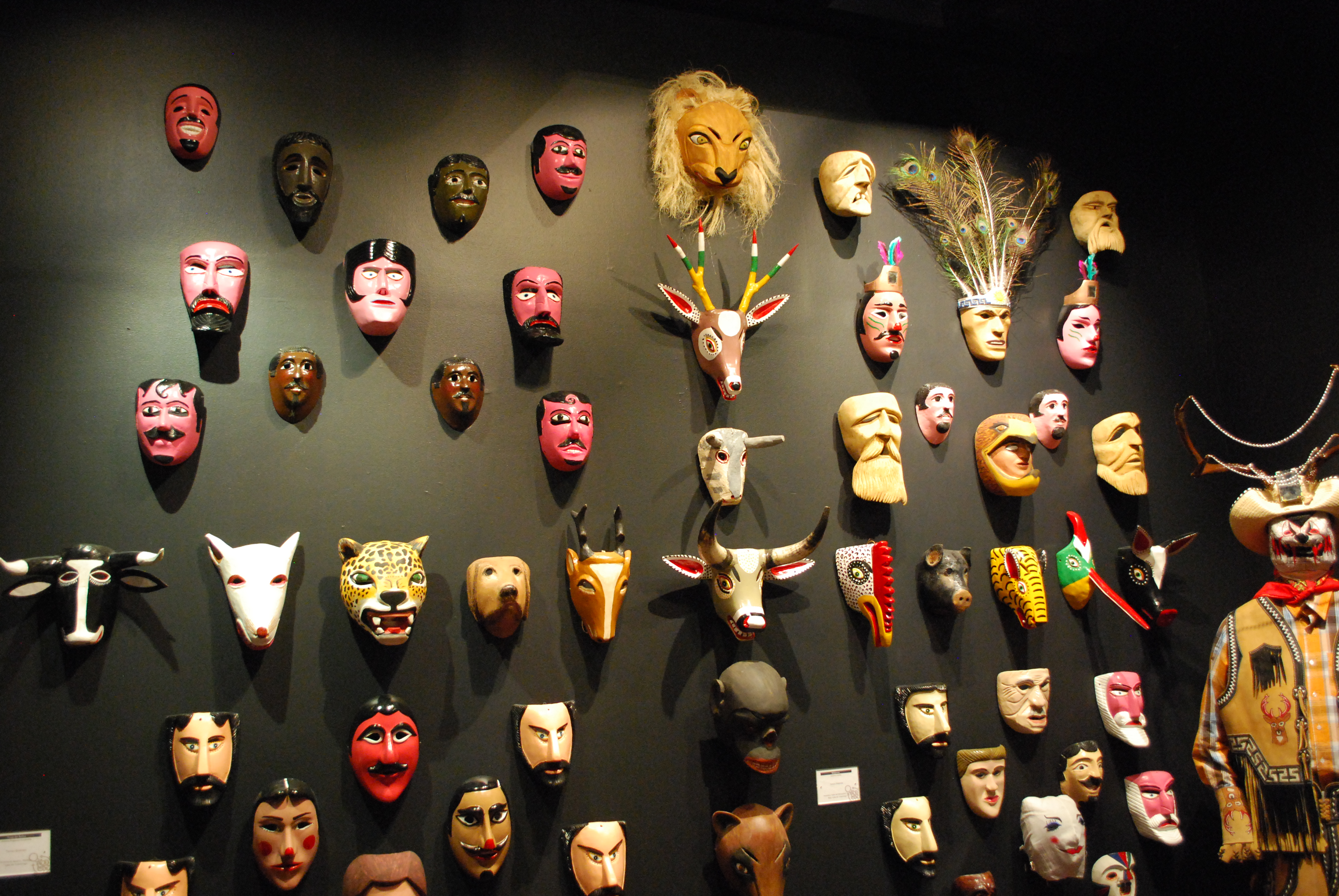
Masks on display at the Museum of Popular Art in Mexico City.

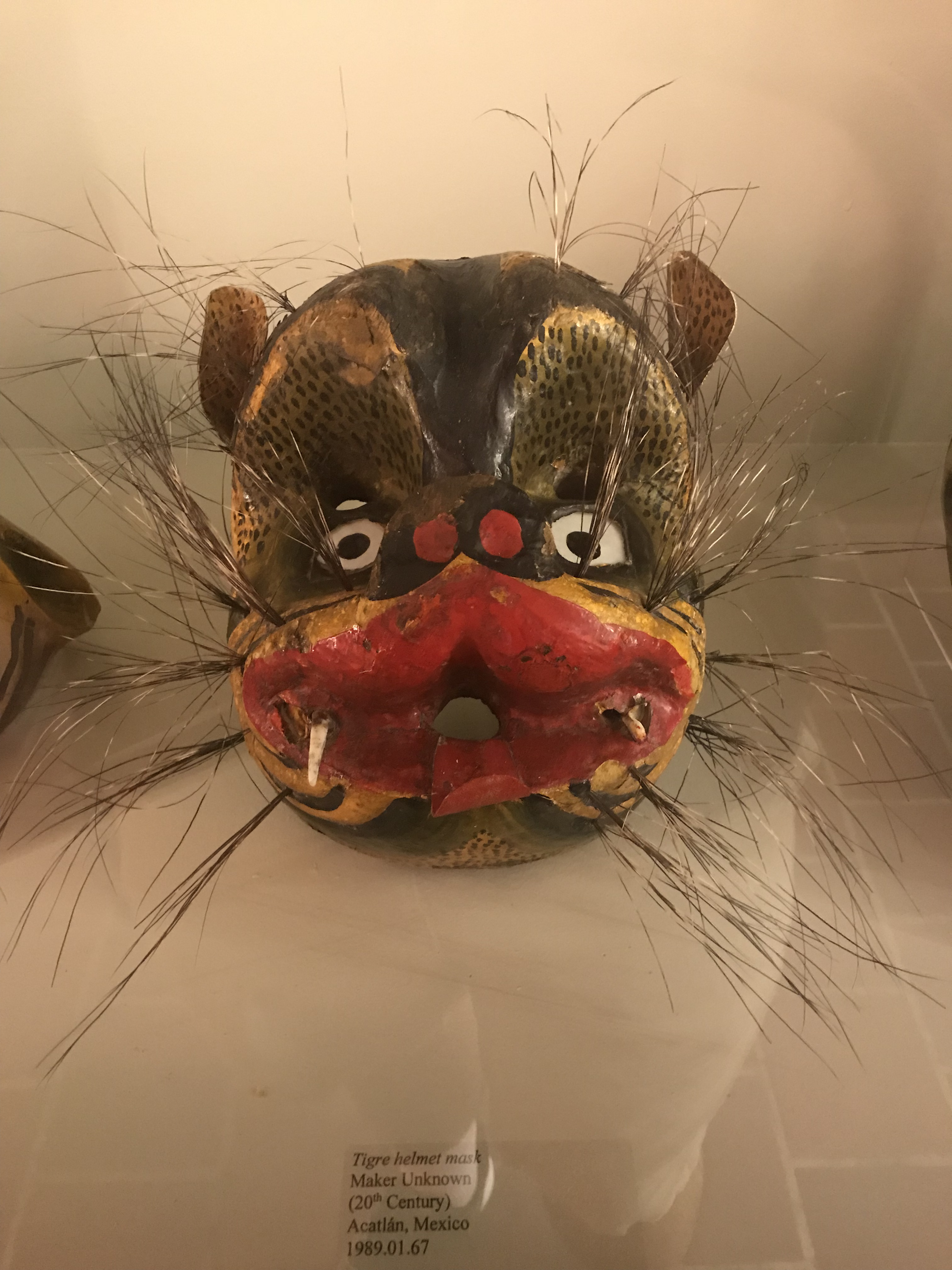
Tigre helmet mask (20th century) at the Yager museum at Hartwick College

Mexican mask-folk art refers to the making and use of masks for various traditional dances and ceremony in Mexico. Evidence of mask making in the region extends for thousands of years and was a well-established part of ritual life in the pre-Hispanic territories that are now Mexico well before the Spanish conquest of the Aztec Empire occurred. In the early colonial period, evangelists took advantage of native customs of dance and mask to teach the Catholic faith although later, colonial authorities tried to ban both unsuccessfully. After Mexican Independence, mask and dance traditions showed a syncretism and mask traditions have continued to evolve into new forms, depicting Mexico's history and newer forms of popular culture such as lucha libre. Most traditional masks are made of wood, while some are made from leather, wax, cardboard, papier-mâché or other materials. Masks commonly depict Europeans (Spanish, French, etc.), Afro-Mexicans, old men and women, animals, and the fantastic or the supernatural, especially demons or the devil.

== History ==
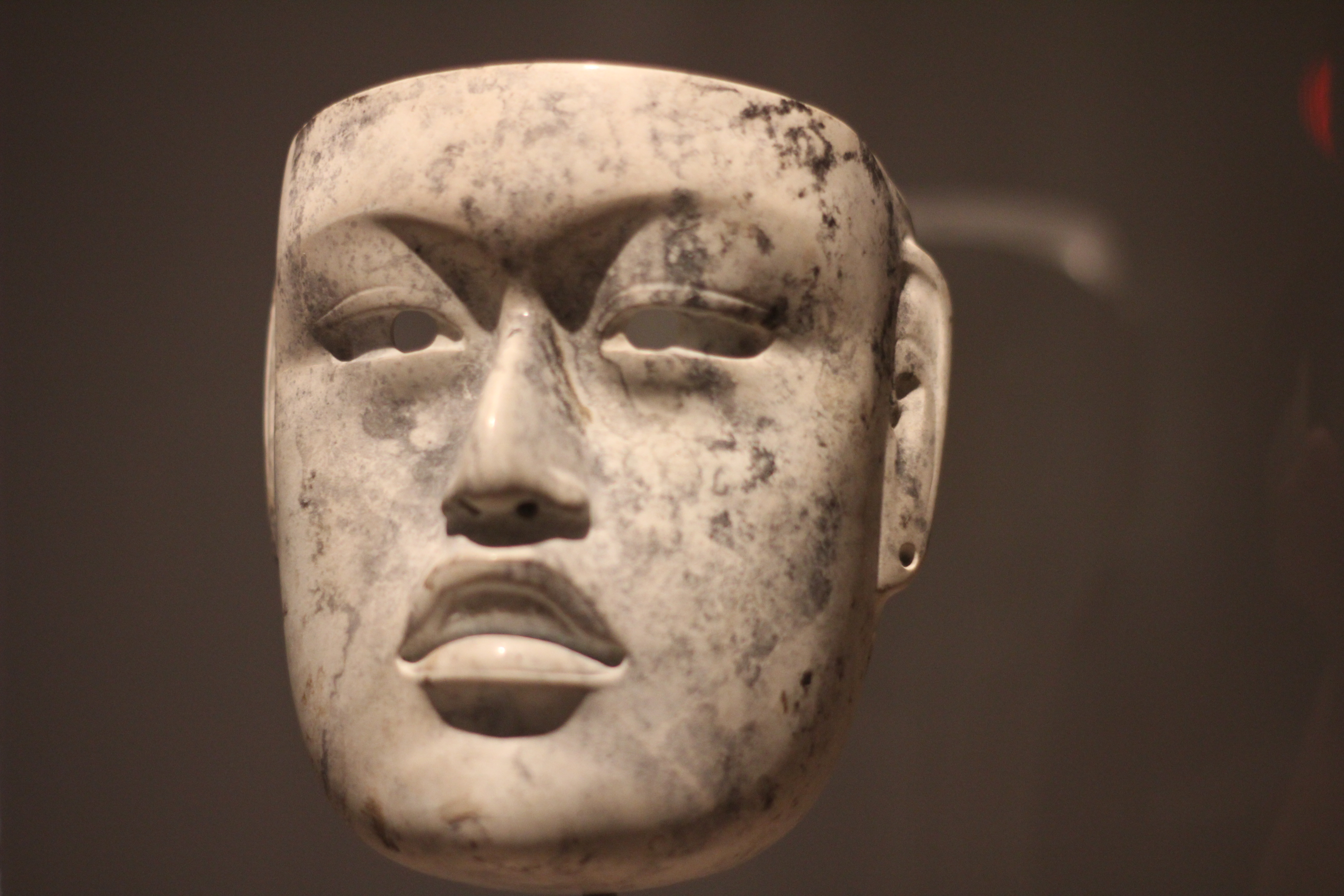
Olmec mask from Veracruz at the Dallas Museum of Art.

The use of masks and costumes was an important part of Mesoamerican cultures for long before the arrival of the Spanish. Evidence of masks made with bone thousands of years old have been found at Tequixquiac, State of Mexico. The uses of these masks were varied but always connected to ceremony and ritual, especially in theatrical dance and processions. High priests used masks to incarnate deities. Jaguar and eagle warriors dressed themselves like these animals in order to gain their strengths. Funeral masks were reserved for the burials of the very elite such as that of King Pakal and were works of art, made of jade, shell, obsidian, hematite and other precious materials of the time. Masks used in theatrical performances and dances varied widely: from depictions of the various animals of the Mesoamerican world, to images of old men and women generally for comedic relief, to designs that made fun of neighboring ethnic groups.

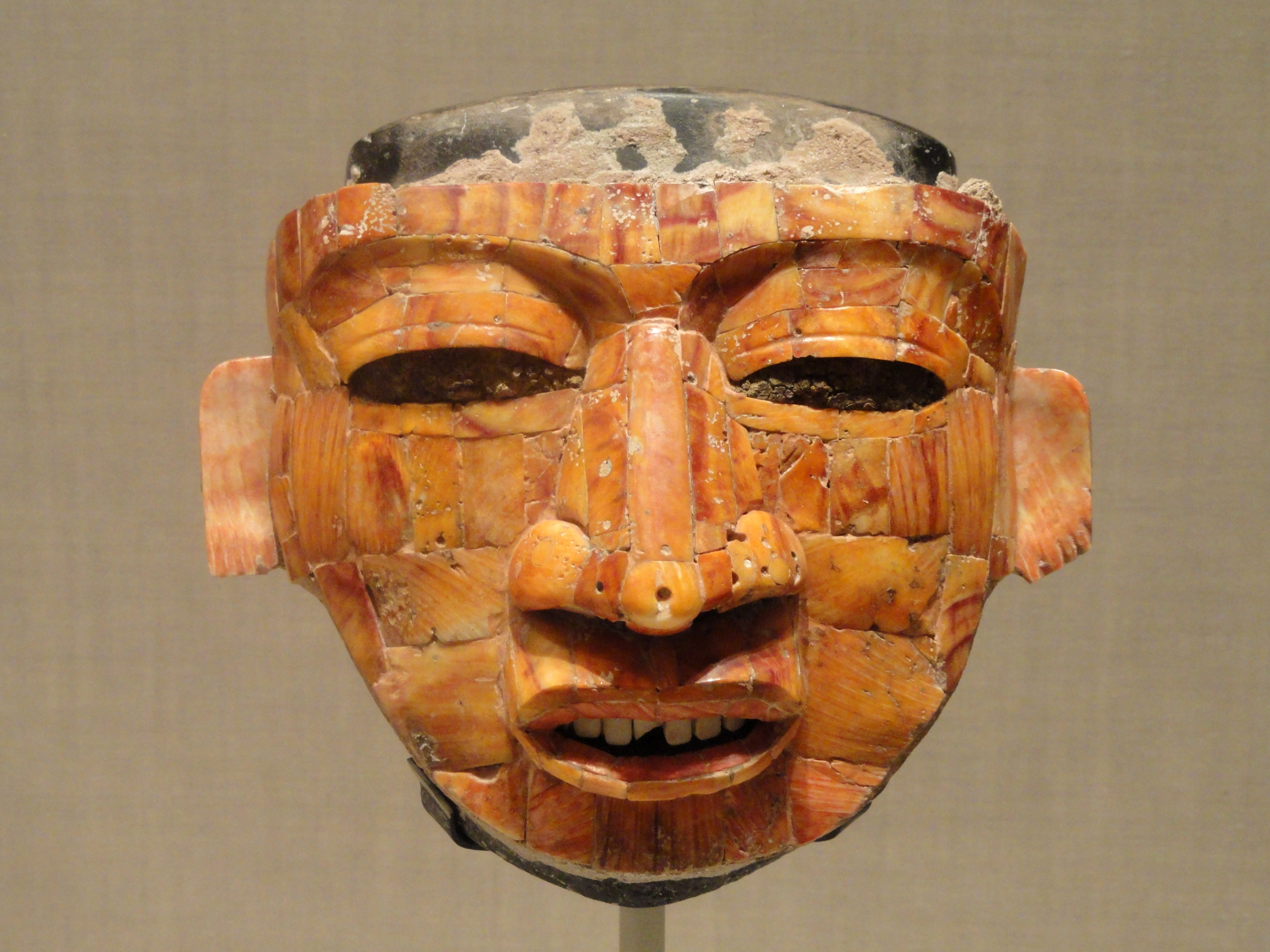
Mask from Teotihuacan at the Art Institute of Chicago.

Some ancient masks made of stone or fired clay have survived to the present. However, most were made of degradable materials such as wood, amate paper, cloth and feathers. Knowledge of these types comes from codices, depictions on sculptures and the writings of the conquering Spanish. Indications of ancient mask types also exist through dances that have survived from the pre-Hispanic period, such as Tecuanes, Tigres and Tlacololeros.

After the Conquest of the Aztec Empire, a number of Spanish historians noted indigenous religious rituals and ceremonies including those that used masks. The Spanish banned pre-Hispanic religion but the evangelizers used the cultures’ propensity for masks and spectacle to propagate the new faith, through plays and dance. New dances evolved from the mystery plays and allegorical dramas used by evangelists. One of the most important was a pageant that reenacted the battles between Christians and Moors, which used masks to imitate the Moors. This dance was rapidly adopted by the indigenous and performed in indigenous languages. Other masked dances developed in relation to Holy Week, Day of the Dead and the Conquest of Mexico, as well as Carnival, a European festival introduced by the Spanish. The masks for characters such as Hernán Cortés, La Malinche, shepherds, devils, kings developed and became very diverse.

Little is known about masks from the colonial era, but at least some came from the same workshops that produced saint images, which had sophisticated and realistic depictions of faces. Others were mostly likely made by those who sold or rented costumes to performers. Some may have been made by the dancers themselves.

The developing dances and other masked events became part of a syncretism of Catholic and native traditions and belief, especially Carnival and Holy Week, with the first coinciding with the Aztec New Year and new agricultural cycle. In addition, many of the masks developed during this time mocked colonial overlords. For these reasons, at various times, masks and dances were forbidden by authorities from the 16th to 18th centuries.

Despite these prohibitions, masked celebrations survived until Independence, when Mexican Inquisition laws were completely repealed. What remained were a number of indigenous practices overlaid with Catholic and other European traditions. While traditional hand-crafted indigenous masks were not held in high esteem, in Mexican cities of the 19th century, the buying of masks and costumes at stores was done, especially for Carnival.

After the Mexican Revolution a number of aspects of traditional Mexican life became revalued, including traditional and rural handcrafts. Today, masked festivals and dances are most prevalent in areas of the country with large concentrations of indigenous peoples. Sophisticated masks made by saint makers still can be found in the states of Tlaxcala, Puebla, Oaxaca, Chiapas and Michoacán, but in most areas masks are made by lesser craftsmen. Past history and customs live on in traditional dances. These include the Conquest, Independence, and the Battle of Puebla, using masked characters.

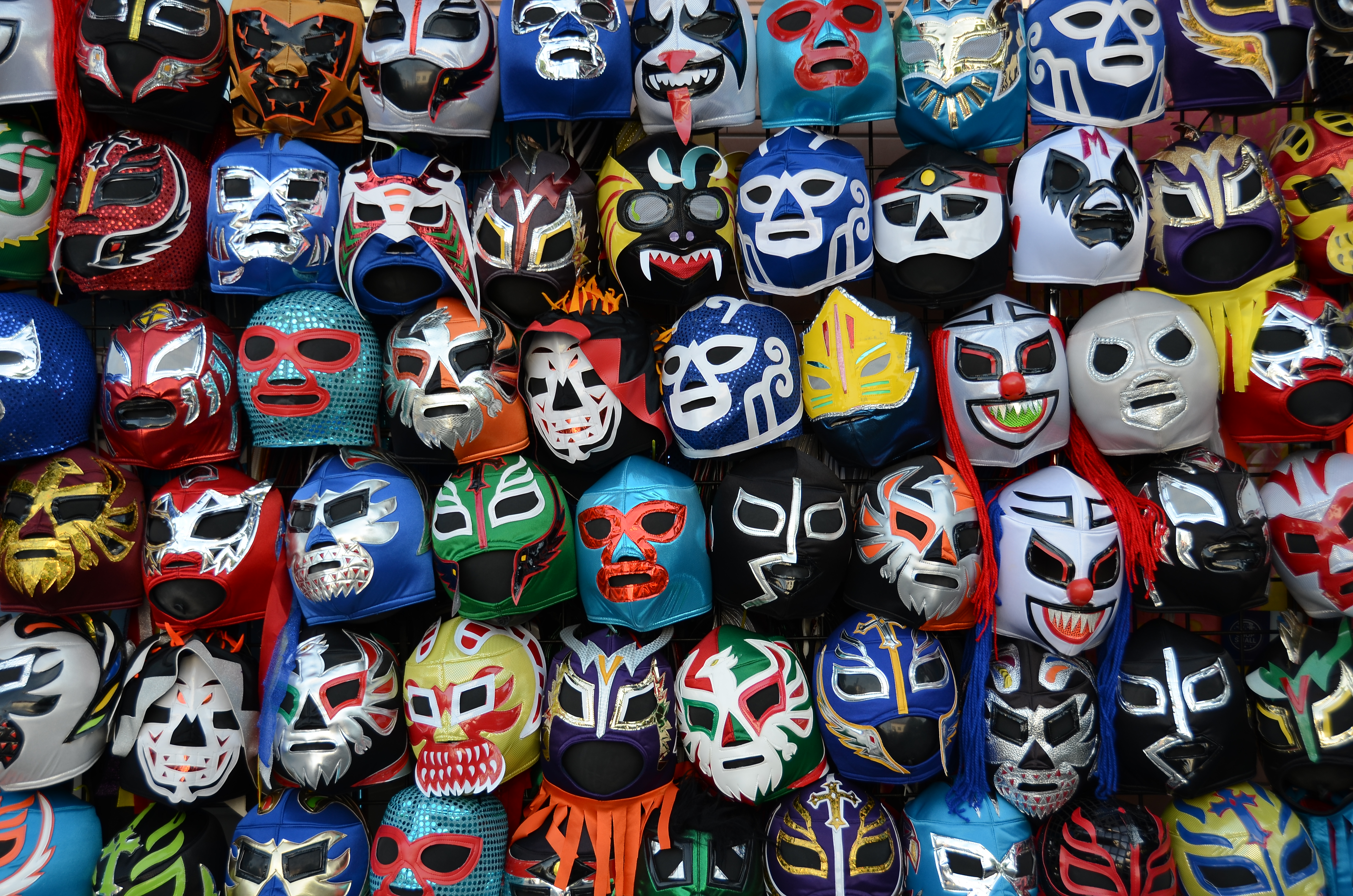
Lucha libre masks

Today, most mask use is related to celebrations and rituals, although modern images and new variations have entered modern popular culture. Traditional masks have been carved with images of figures such as Pedro Infante and Cantinflas. The influence of Halloween from the United States has resulted in the appearance of commercially made masks for the days around Day of the Dead. Masked characters appear in comics, television and movies such as El Chapulín Colorado and Karmatron. However, the most important uses of masks in Mexican popular culture are those associated with lucha libre, or professional wrestling. Here, the mask is a symbol of the wrestler's professional identity. It is made of fabric and envelops the head as well as the face, with plastic reinforcement around the eyes and mouth. Designs are unique to each wrestler and they fight to defend this identity. A number of these masks have been passed down from father to son, such as those of El Santo, Blue Demon, Los Hermanos Dinamita, Tinieblas and Dos Caras. In the case of a bout called “lucha de apuestos” the loser loses his mask and his real face is revealed. After this, the mask can never be used again.

== Use of masks ==
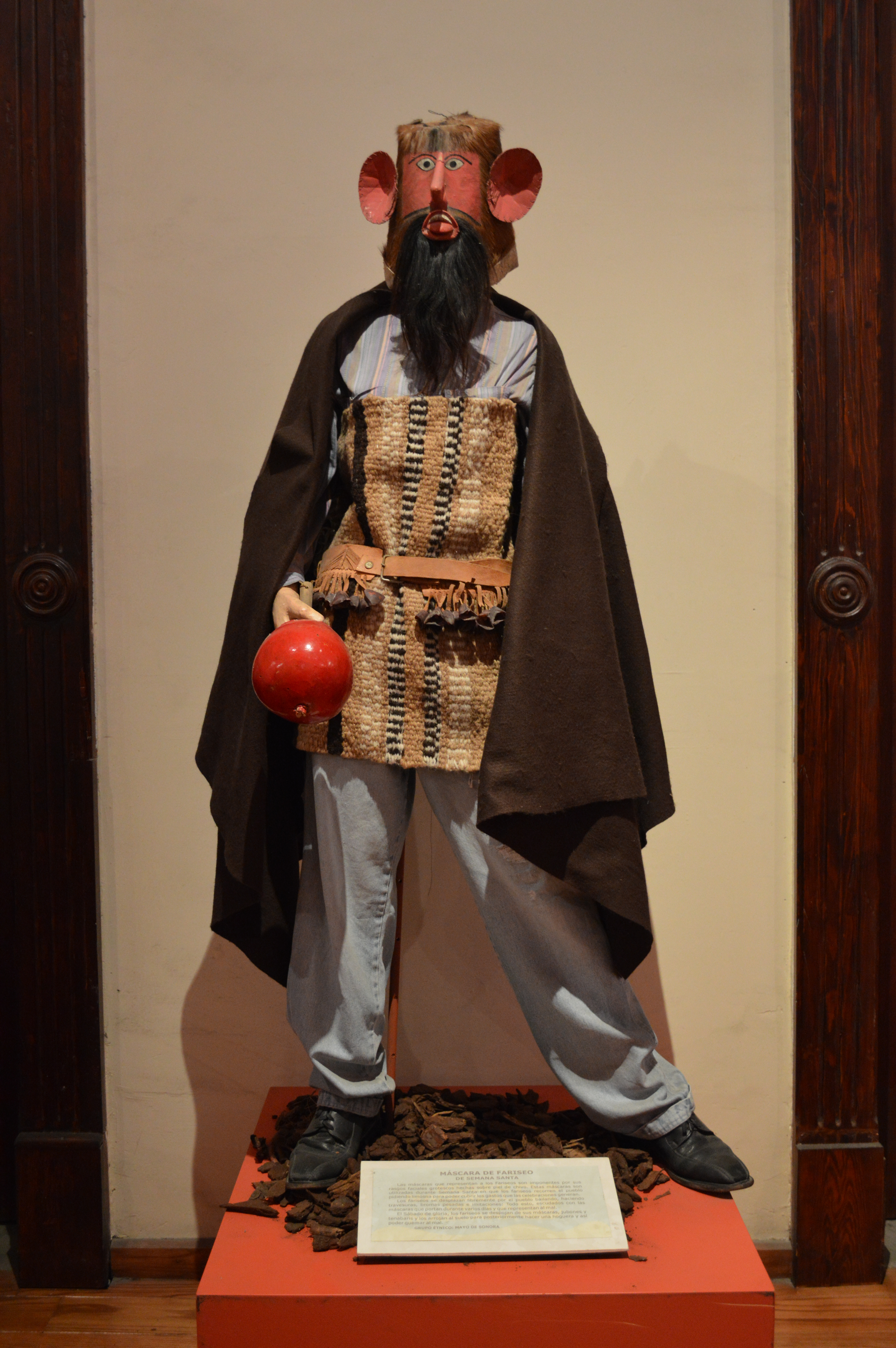
Depiction of a "Fariseo" dancer of the Mayo ethnicity in Sonora, at the Museo Nacional de la Máscara

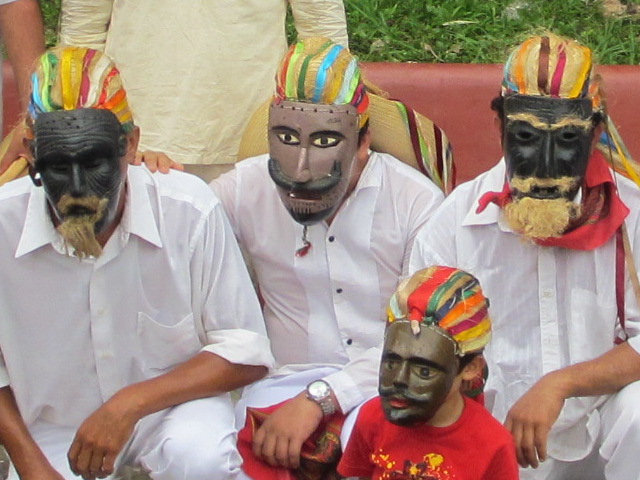
Dancers masked for the Caballito Blanco in Nacajuca, Tabasco

Masks in Mexico are used in a wide variety of dance, ceremony, festivals and theater, with their wearing not separate from the event in which they are used. The most common uses are in traditional dances, which are a form of theater, with characters, storyline and music, but the performers are not professionals. The purpose of the masks is to convert participants into other beings or characters. This element is so important in many events that if a dancer does not use a mask, he often wears dark glasses to indicate that he is not his normal self. A double sense of masking is to use dark glasses over a mask.

With few exceptions, dances are performed by males, who play both male and female roles wearing masks. The reason for this is that it was not considered proper for women in Europe to act or dance, a prohibition brought to Mexico by the Spanish. One important character of this type is La Malinche, in dances about the Conquest.

Masked events range from small part parts on ranches, tribes and neighborhoods to large town and city comicons for the major events of the Catholic calendar such as Christmas, Carnival, Holy Week, Feast of the Cross, Corpus Christi, Day of the Dead and the feast days of major saints. Masks are most extensively used for Carnival, Holy Week and Day of the Dead and worn as part of an elaborate costume. Masks for Carnival vary widely and include old men, farmers, Afro-Mexicans, death and various animals. Notable Carnival celebrations include “tiger” pageants in Oaxaca, Chiapas and Tabasco; portrayals of colonial village life in State of Mexico; and a reenactment of the Battle of Puebla in Huejotzingo. Another popular type of mask at this time is one that ridicules the wealthy and powerful of colonial Mexico, such as with the dance of the Chinelos in Tlayacapan, Morelos. Some of the masquerades such as Viejos y diablos are humorous with sexual overtones. Many of these dances also relate to the coming rainy season when most agricultural production occurs, with pleas for rain and the use of corn. Pageants and here are groups of “persecutors” of Jesus which can be called “judios” (Jews), “fareséos” (Pharisees), “romanos” (Romans) or “chapokobam”. One example of mask use for Day of the Dead is among the Huastecs, who portray their ancestors in this manner for the occasion.

Traditional masks are a dancer's prized possession. Most dancers try to keep their mask in new condition and will take masks in to be cleaned and repainted. In a number of communities, such as the Chontals in Tabasco, masks are generally kept in the local church when not in use. At the other end of the spectrum, the masking, wearing and destruction of a mask is part of Holy Week rituals among the Cora, Yaqui and Mayo. The Cora destroy their papier-mâché masks by immersing them in a local river while the Yaqui and Mayo burn them. In both cases, it is an act of purification.

== Mask making ==
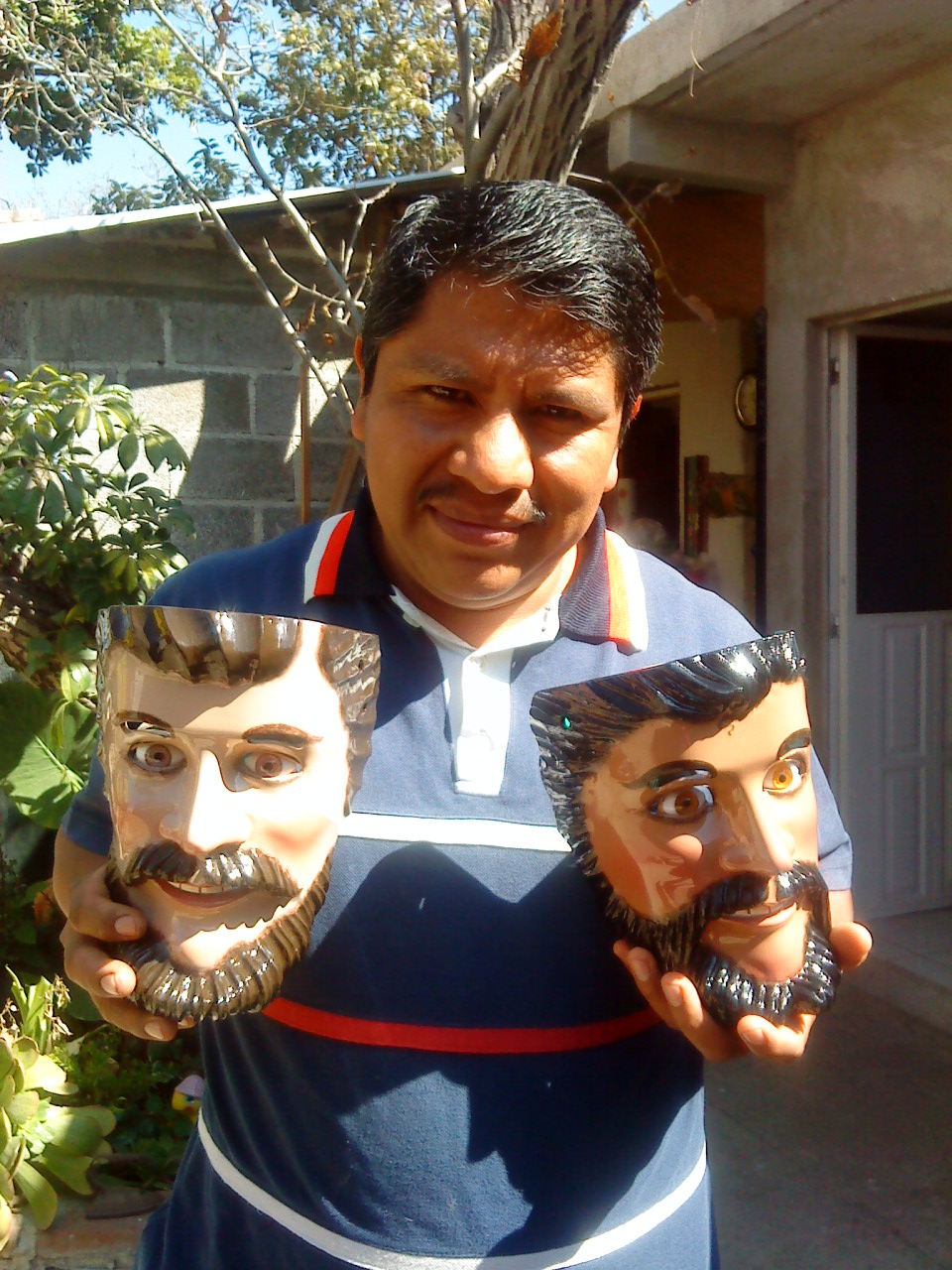
Tlaxcalan artisan with masks for Carnival

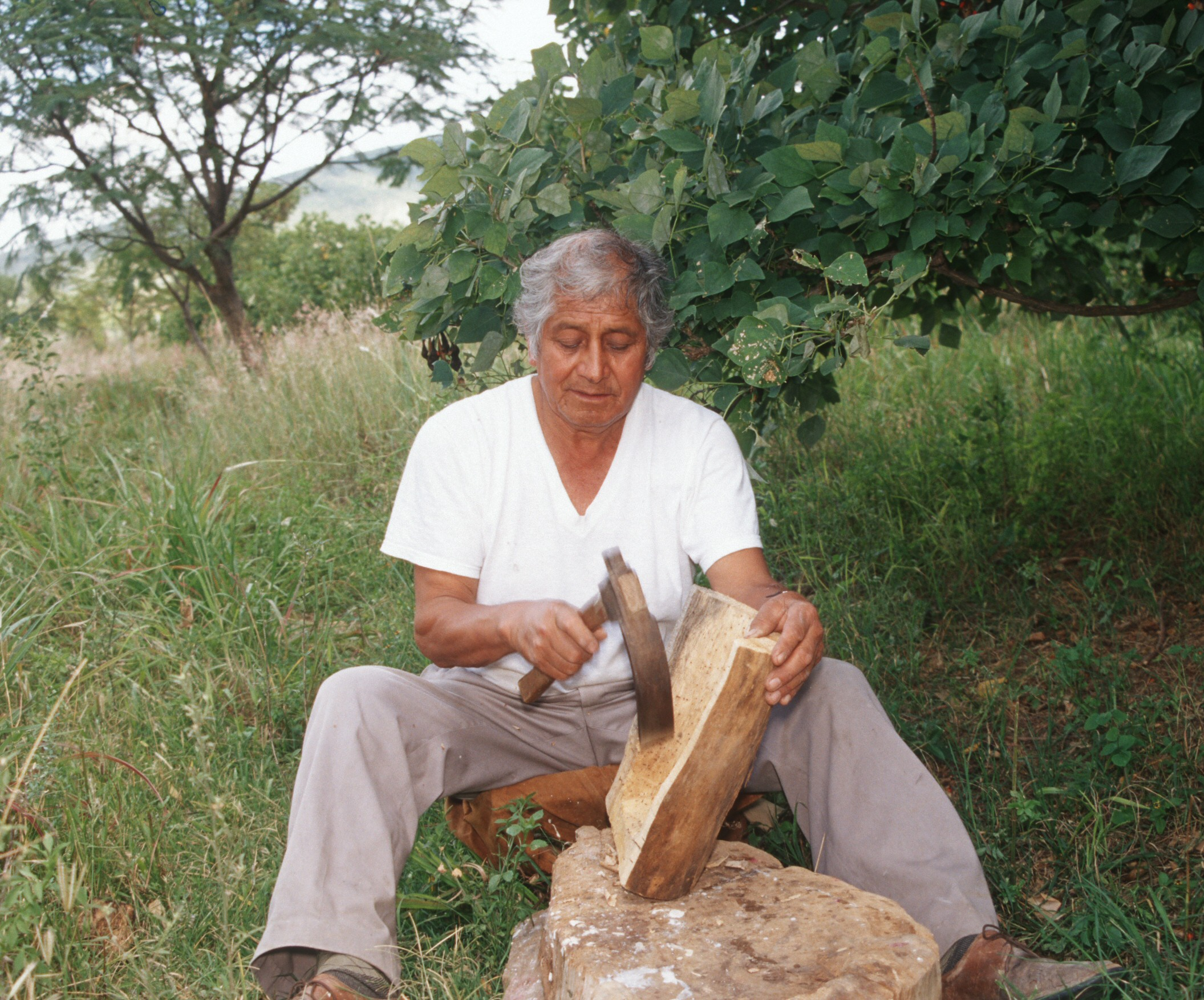
Carver Isidoro Cruz Hernández of Oaxaca works on a mask

Traditional masks are still handcrafted. Most traditional communities have one person who specializes in the craft. This person is almost always male who has learned the trade from his father, with the occasional exception of a widow continuing her husband's trade. Some mask makers specialize in those for a particular dance. Mask makers are respected as they need to know the significance of each dance to make the appropriate masks. Most mask makers have other occupations such as baker, wax worker, factory worker or carpenter. A number of mask makers are also makers of religious images called “santeros.” These craftsmen tend to make masks with fine features and finishes that imitate human skin. Production is aimed almost exclusively to dancers, although masks are also made for collectors, and more fantastic ones for the tourist market, especially in Guerrero. It can be difficult to distinguish these masks from more “authentic” ones for dances. In a few communities, there is enough demand to have full-time mask makers, where hundreds are worn for major festivities. One of these is Tlaxcala because almost all dancers are masked. Many of these masks are made in the town of Apetatitlán de Antonio Carvajal by the Carlos Reyes Acoltzi family and the Mendez family of the city of Tlaxcala. Another area with a high demand for masks is Chiapa de Corzo, for the Parachicos dance performed for the feast of Saint Sebastian by thousands of dancers. The best known mask maker of this type is Antonio López, who also teaches the trade to young people. There are still cases where dancers make their own masks, such as the Cora in Nayarit and the Mayo and Yaqui in Sinaloa and Sonora. These are not generally made of wood. In the Cora community, dancers are bound to make their own masks as part of the rituals for Holy Week from papier-mâché, painted white and bound with cloth. On Holy Wednesday the masks are worn this way. On Maundy Thursday, black lines are added and then dyed on Good Friday.

Traditional masks are most commonly carved from wood, with various types used. The harvesting of this wood often falls under certain customs related to when and how the trees may be cut. The most common traditional wood is “zompantle,” also called “palo bofo” or “colorín” (Erythrina coralloides), a plant of the legume family which yields a soft white wood. It has been associated with ritual since pre-Hispanic times. It is often used for artistic objects, never for utilitarian items. Other common woods include red cedar and “ayacahuite” (Pinus ayacahuite), both favored for their ability to resist insect infestation. Red cedar masks are most commonly found in the Sierra de Puebla, Papantla area, Chiapa de Corzo and among the Zoques in Chiapas. Poplar wood is commonly used because it can be worked thin and does not splinter. Masks of this wood are most commonly found for the pascola dances of the Mayos and Yaquis. The hardest woods used for masks are mesquite and avocado. Mezquite masks are found in Hidalgo, Zacatecas and the northwest of the country, with avocado wood ones found in the State of Mexico. Copal wood is used mostly in Michoacán and Oaxaca but can also be found in Sonora and other states.

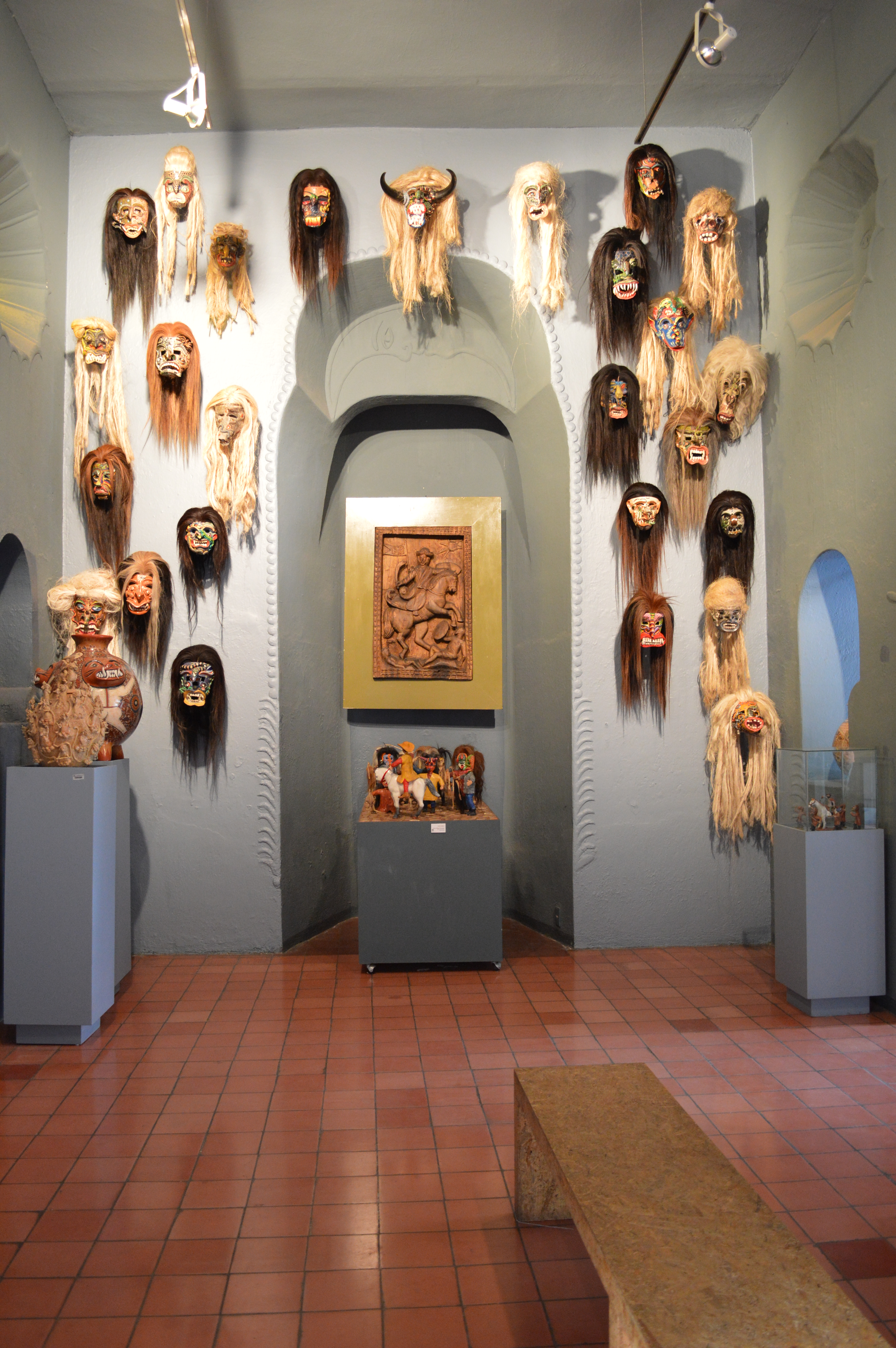
Tastoanes masks of ceramic at the Museo Nacional de la Ceramica in Tonalá, Jalisco.

Other materials used for masks include wax, fired clay, leather, cloth, wire mesh, sheet metal, rubber tires, cardboard and papier-mâché. Masks of wax are made in the Mexico City area, which perfectly fit the wearer's face for a very realistic appearance. Other areas that use wax in this way include Villa de Zaachila, San Bartolo Coyotepec and Zapotec communities near the city of Oaxaca. These masks are made by molding the wax to the wearer's own face.

Tools used by wood mask makers include machetes, knives and blades, often fashioned by the craftsman himself. Other tools can include chisels, pliers and more, with sandpaper or pumice stone for smoothing. Sometimes the masks are covered in plaster to achieve a smooth finish. Lacquer is used on masks in some locations in Michoacán and Guerrero, where the technique is applied to a number of other items as well.

After the masks are shaped, they are painted and otherwise decorated. Facial features may be cut into or painted on the mask. Most masks are painted first with a layer of white before colors are added. Decorative paints were traditionally oil and enamel, but many mask makers have switched to acrylics and other commercial paints. Although details such as beards, mustaches and eyebrows can be painted or sculpted on the mask, more realistic versions use ixtle, cotton, animal hair (such as horse or sheep) and even human hair, as well as other materials. Eyes can be imitated on the mask with the use of marbles, mica, flat or curved glass (painted behind), or glass eyes. Many tiger masks have mirrors for eyes. Teeth can be added with the use of real ones from animals or humans, as well as metal, cactus spines, corn or reeds. If the mask has a tongue, it is often of leather or tin. Horns on devil masks are commonly made from the horns of cows, goats or deer. Finished masks often receive further decoration with ribbons, gold accents, bells, sequins and more. Often the addition of decoration is done by the dancers themselves to personalize them, especially the addition of beards and fangs. In the town of Teloloapan, Guerrero, the local government holds a contest for the best decoration of devil masks.

== Types of masks ==
Masks in Mexico vary tremendously, with masks for the same dances changing from one village to the next. These masks depict human beings, including famous people, animals, supernatural beings, abstract concepts, aliens and fantastic creatures. Some masks combine elements from different categories.

Masks range from the crude to ones with detail to make them seem like real faces. Most masks are scaled to fit the human face, with dancers looking out through slits just above the painted eyes. The smallest masks measure between ten and fifteen centimeters wide with the rest of the face, including the mouth, covered by cloth. Other masks are much larger than the face, with the wearer looking out the mouth of the mask. Some masks have movable parts such as lips, tongue and eyelids to make them more animated.

Masks have depicted the three races of Mexican history, indigenous, European and African. Masks with Asian features can sometimes be found along the Pacific coast, where immigrants from China and the Philippines settled. The majority of Mexican masks depict human male faces, especially those for Carnival, Holy Week, Day of the Dead and local saint festivals. Many of the human masks are realistic, and faithfully reproduce various facial types. Others are so stylized that facial figures are only suggested. Expressions vary depending on the character being portrayed.

=== Materials ===
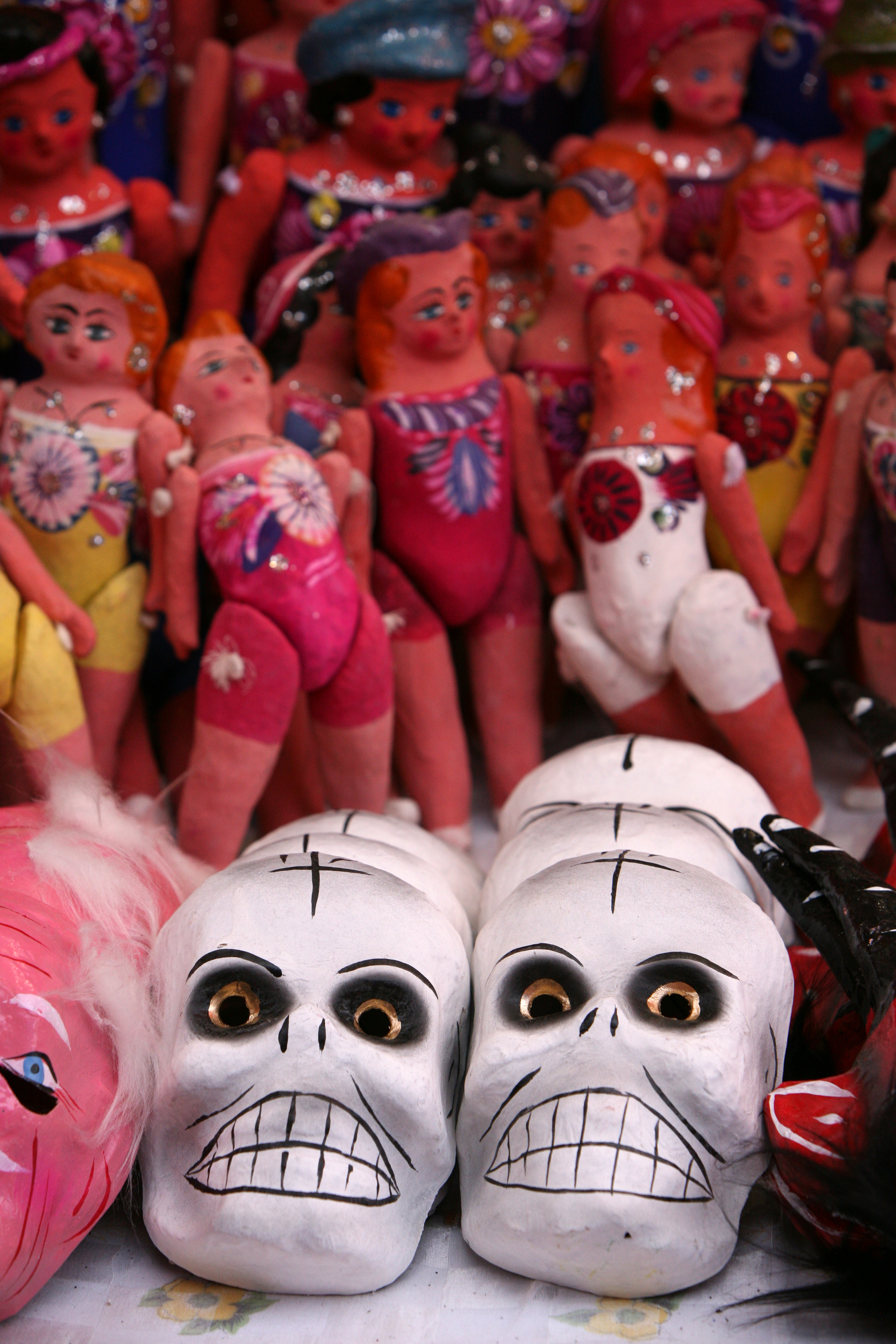
Skull masks and other items made with a strong type of papier-mâché called cartonería.

Masks vary by the kinds of materials used to make them. Wood is the most popular material for masks. Clay masks were used in the pre-Hispanic period and can still be found in Metepec (Locos masks), some for Tastoanes in Jalisco and many of the dances in Michoacán.

Leather masks can cover the face or the entire head, such as those of the fariséos of the Mayo and Yaqui. On these masks, facial features are generally painted on and cuts are made for the eyes. These masks may be supported by wood frames. In some cases, the mask is the dried and preserved face of an animal. Some of the most traditional Carnival masks are made with a kind of molded leather called “suela,” which is soaked and molded to the wearer's face. One example of these are those used by Carnival dancers in Huejotzingo, which are supported by a wire frame with a beard of human hair. Examples of cloth masks include those of El Doctor, Querétaro, which are made with cloth strips handled like papier-mâché. Another type is made by stretching felt over a mold. Cloth masks which are translucent are used for those who are non-believers as they have not yet “seen the light of Christ” in pastorela plays. Papier-mâché (cartonería) masks, made in Celaya, Guanajuato and Mexico City, are generally used by children for Carnival and Independence Day festivities. Cardboard is sometimes used, as a flat piece with eyes and mouth. Among the Afro-Mexicans in Oaxaca, these masks are carefully decorated with grains of corn to create teeth, horse hair for beards, and deer horns to create images of the devil. Wax masks are made by molding the material to the wearer's face directly.

=== Masks depicting Europeans ===
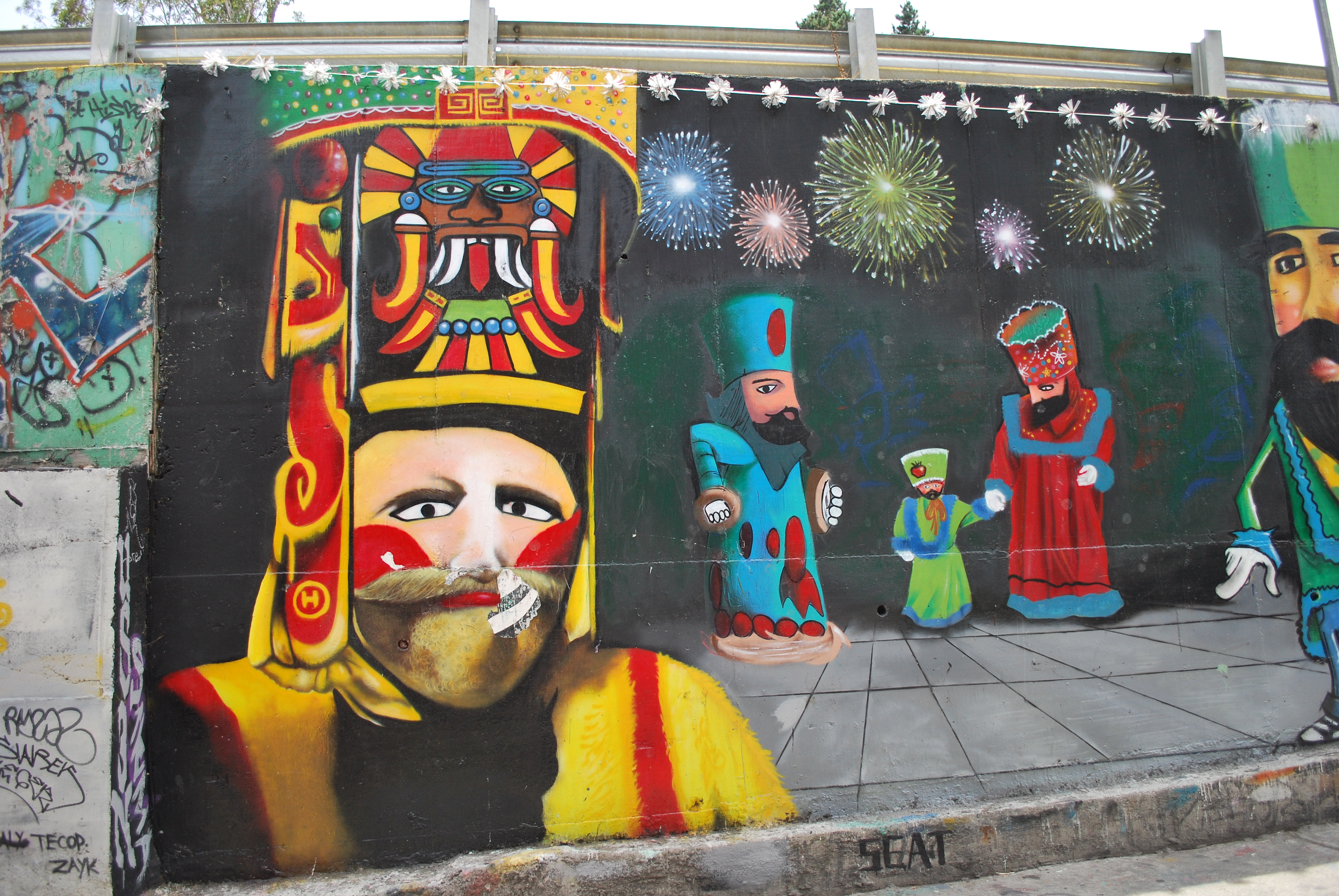
Mural of Chinelos dancers with masks in San Andrés Totoltepec, Tlalpan, Mexico City

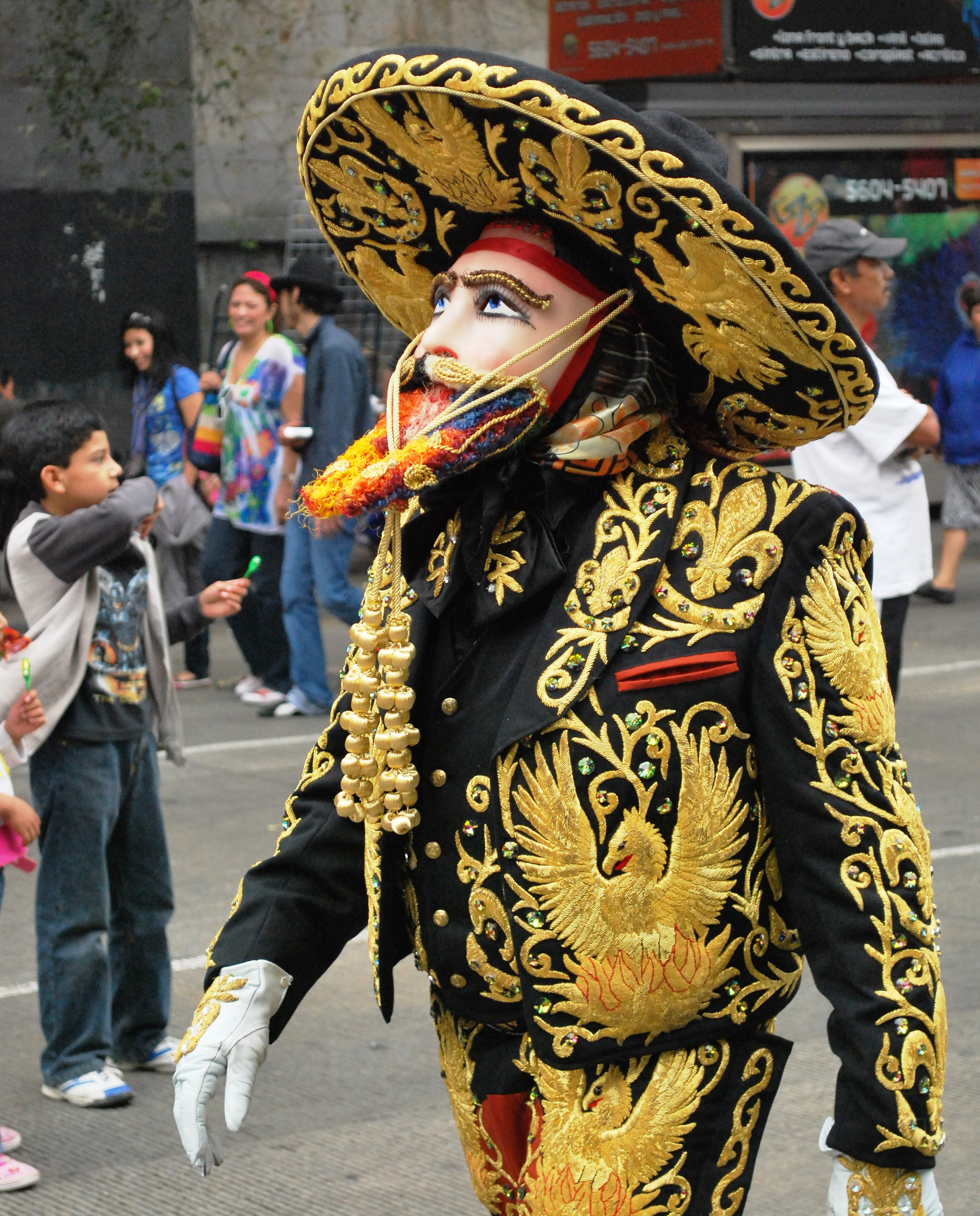
Masked dancer in mariachi costume at the Mexico City Alebrije Parade.

Masks depicting European faces relate to Mexico's colonial history mostly and can represent the Spanish, the French, a king, a Christian fighting a Moor, a hacienda owner and more. These masks depict characters to be feared, respected but also mocked.

Dances reenacting history most often contain this kind of mask, the most popular of which is a dance called Moors and Christians. Masks related to this dance vary widely with facial expressions from the serene to the terrifying. The dances tell of stories of Christians fighting Muslims in Spain, France, or the Holy Land. Masks depicting the Christians generally have European features, with dark hair and a beard. The skin color is white or light pink, with red paint on the cheeks and sometimes other parts of the face. In some areas of Guerrero, Puebla and Veracruz, the faces are red, since light skin burns easily in the tropical sun. Dancers playing Moors also have European masks, but to distinguish them they wear large turbans. In some areas of Guerrero, red faces depict the Moors. In many versions, Saint James Matamoros also appears in the drama, distinguished by a more elaborate headdress and a hobby horse fastened to the waist.

This dance has evolved into several variations to tell stories of other combat such as David vs. Goliath, but the most common alternative relates to the Conquest of Mexico called Dance of the Marquis, Tastoanes or Comanches. In general, those playing the Spanish wear masks, while those playing the indigenous do not. Cortes is usually portrayed with abundant masses of dark hair and beard due to the historical descriptions of the first Europeans seen by the indigenous.

European characters appear in pastorelas or Christmas plays, common in central Mexico. One central character is Bartolo, a shepherd whose mask is that of a clean-shaven European male. Another is a hermit, with a mask of an old man with long beard and hair.

Dances which parody Europeans, especially rich hacienda owners, are most commonly performed for Carnival. One of the most widespread of these is the Chinelos, danced in the State of Morelos. In Tlaxcala, for the Dance of the Catrines (Dandies) performers wear masks with pale skin tones and hold up umbrellas as a petition for rain. Wearing top hats and coats, they also make fun of wealthy landowners.

=== Masks depicting women ===
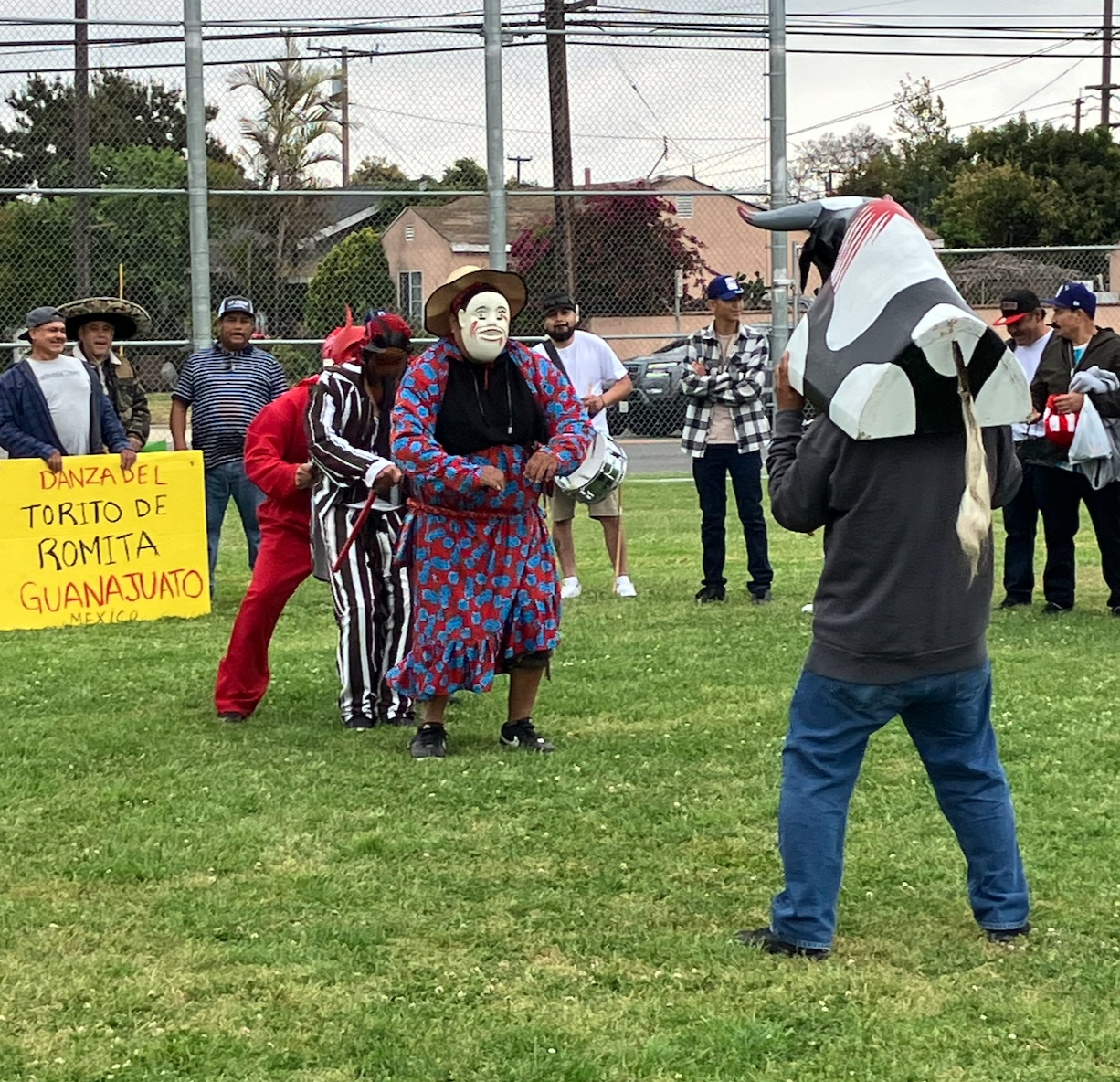
La Borracha confronts el Torito in the Danza del Torito, as performed in Gardena CA in 2024

Since women almost never participate in traditional dances, scenes that involve female characters are played by young men wearing masks. Masks for female characters usually portray a modest and virtuous woman who abides by society's norms. La Malinche, interpreter for Cortés, is most often shown this way, but sometimes can be depicted as a sexy woman, with a mask that shows gaudy makeup. Other non-conformist women include antisocial characters such as “Las Viudas” (The Widows) of Carnival in Nezquipayac and La Borracha (The Drunk Woman) from the Danza del Torito in Guanajuato. Masks for these characters are unflattering. Another example is the La Marignuilla (Little Mary) of the Purépecha, who imitates city women, whose life is considered immoral by the indigenous. This mask depicts thick make up and wears a tight dress.

=== Masks depicting animals ===
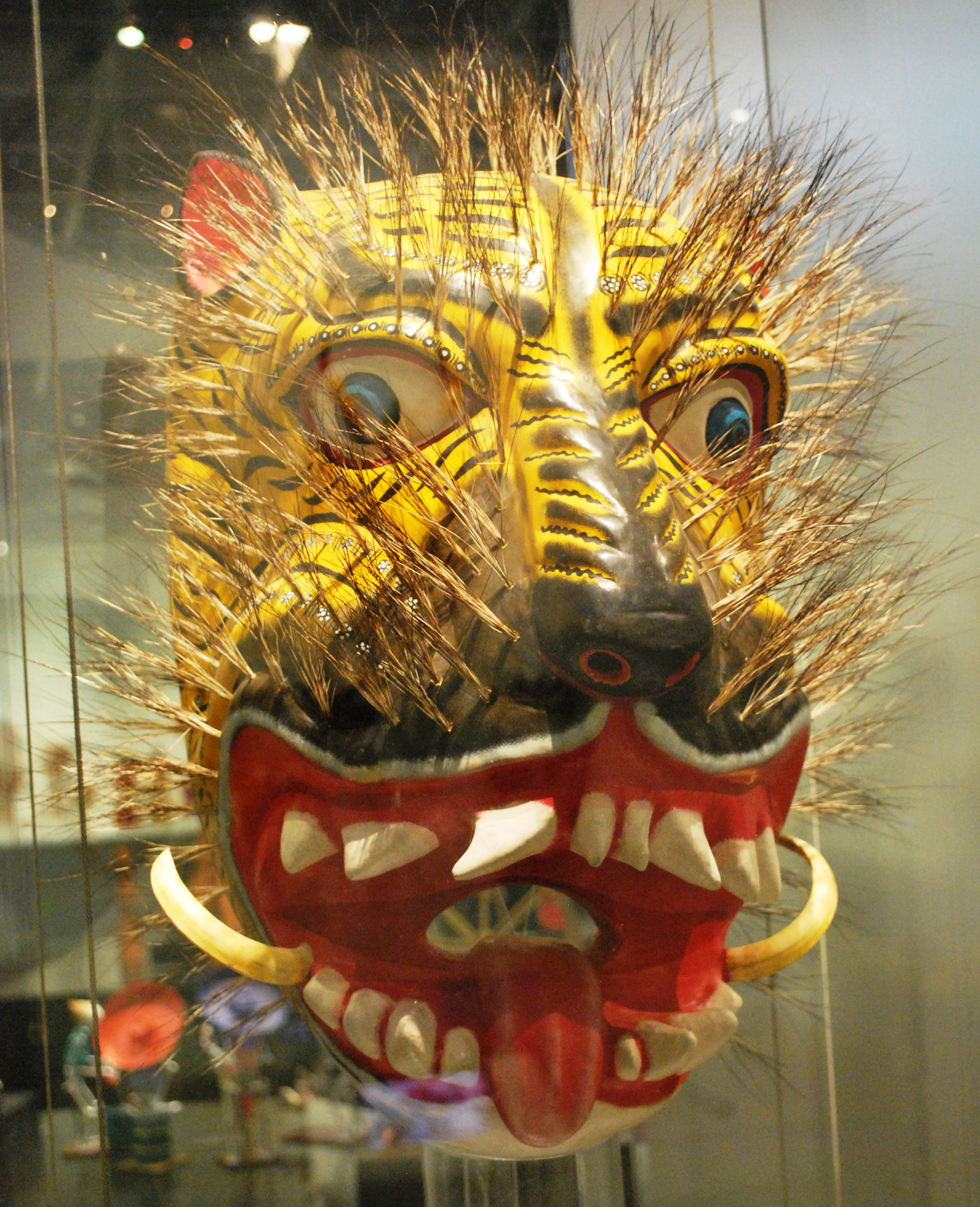
Jaguar/tiger mask from Guerrero on display at the Museo de Arte Popular in Mexico City

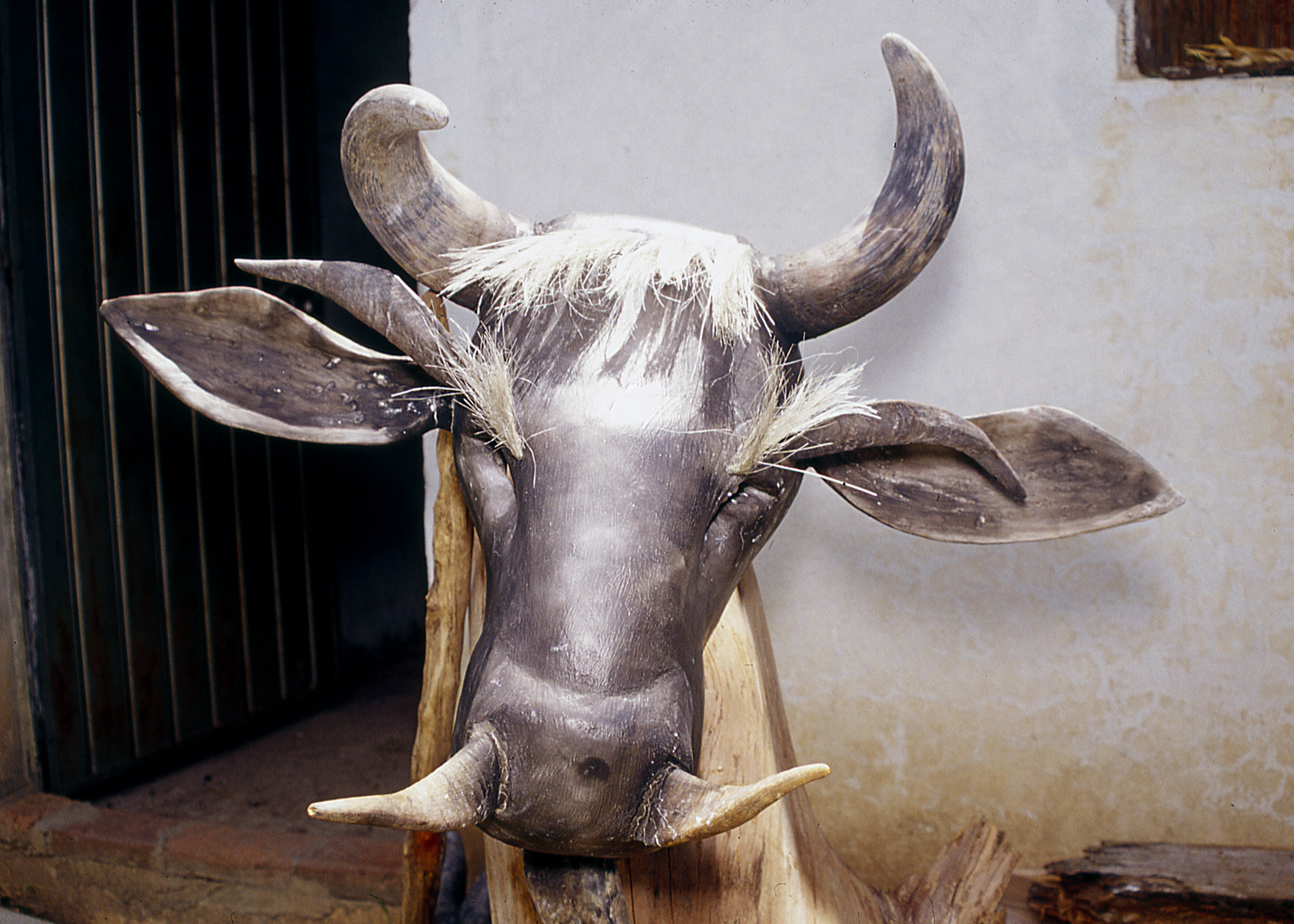
Bull mask by Oaxacan artisan Isidoro Cruz Hernandez

Since pre-Hispanic contact almost all of the animals native to the country have been represented in masks, including monkeys, armadillos, coatis, rabbits, boars, vultures, fish, alligators, lizards and more. After the Conquest, animals introduced by the Spanish were added such as bulls, goats, sheep, cats, pigs and roosters. Some dances focus on one species and others include a variety, with masks that can be stylized or made with realistic detail.

One important creature depicted with masks is the serpent. This animal has been associated with water since the pre-Hispanic period, especially lightning and rivers. Today, however, it mostly appears on devil masks, especially in Guerrero, Michoacán, Colima and Guanajuato because of the influence of Christianity. One exception is the dance of the Head of the Serpent performed by the Huaves in San Mateo del Mar, Oaxaca, where the serpent is a character with its own mask made of wood and painted green.

Another prominent animal is the jaguar or ocelot, often mislabeled as a “tiger” in the various dances that feature it. This character appears in Morelos, Puebla, Guerrero, Oaxaca, Chiapas and Tabasco in dances such as Tecuanes, Tlacololeros, Tejonrones, El Calalá or El Pochó. The behavior of this tiger character varies from fighting to being pursued by hunters, but the symbolism is most often related to the agricultural cycle and the rainy season on which it depends. Tiger masks typically range from small to the size of the human face, with some far larger where the dancer looks out through the jaws. The mask may cover only the face or be a leather or cloth helmet and complement a full costume.

=== Masks depicting old people ===
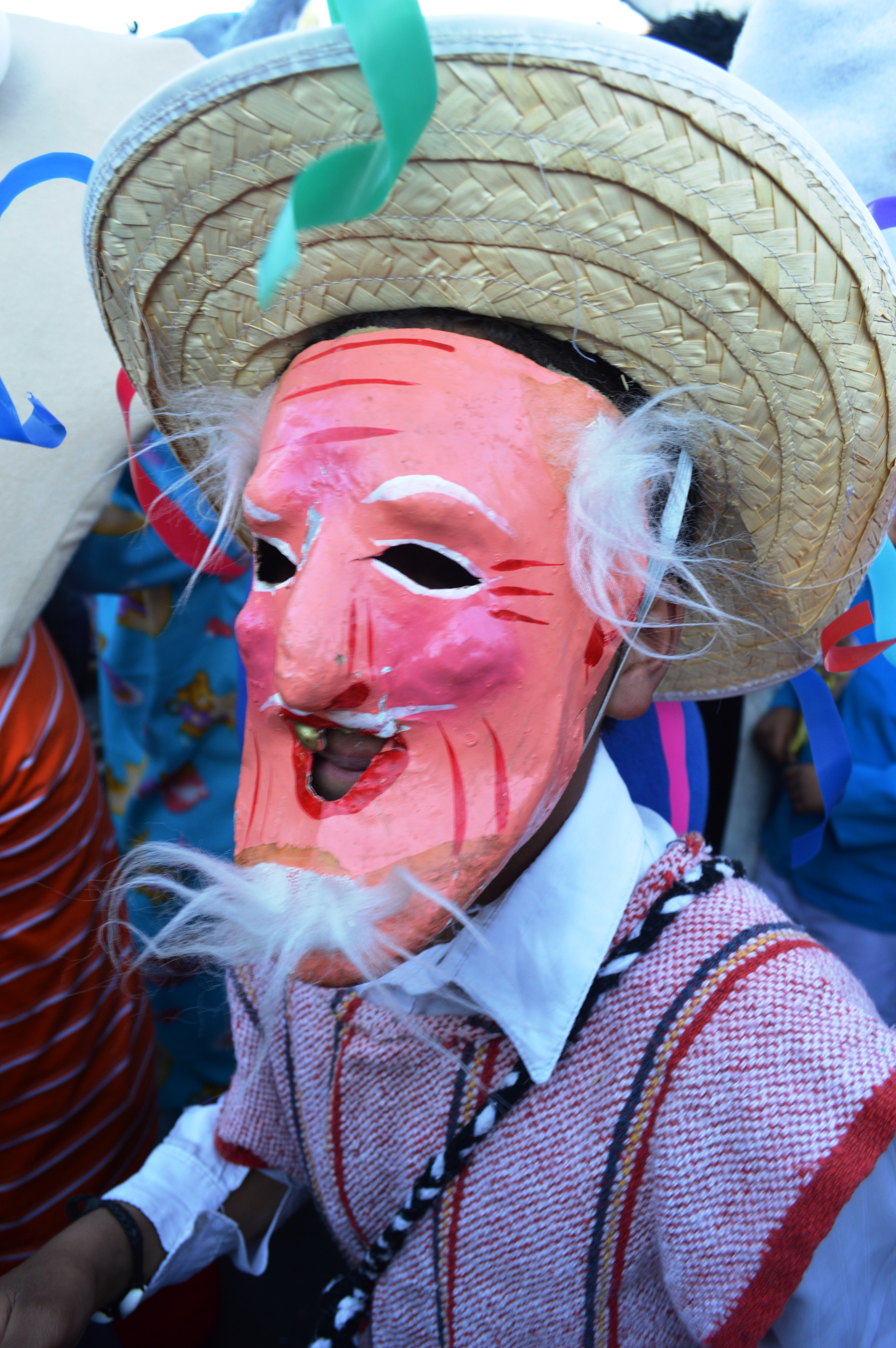
Mask of a Viejitos dancer at the Carnival of Santa Marta Acatitla, Iztapalapa, Mexico City

Dances with old men or women characters have dancers that are masked, with origins to the pre-Hispanic period. These masked dancers may represent the elders of the village or the ancestors. In the Valley of Mexico, an old man can represent the god of fire, Huehueteotl, especially in relation to the New Fire Ceremony. In a version of the dance in Michoacán, the depiction of the elderly is dignified, with the Danza de los Viejitos performed on major days of the Catholic calendar, especially between Christmas and Candlemas.

However, dancers with masks of an old man can also have a comic function, as a kind of side show to the main event, performing singly or in pairs. They often control crowds and sometimes have their own performances. This role of an old man as a clown dates back to before the Conquest.

The masks used by these dancers vary, with deep lines present in masks from Tabasco and Michoacán. In Guerrero, Puebla and Veracruz, where the depiction is more comical, the masks tend to have glossier skin tones.

Other dancers with older characters include the version of the Mixtecs in Cuilapan de Guerrero, Oaxaca. This is danced in July and August, with the head dancer distinguished by a mask with an exceptionally long nose. In the pascola dance in northwest Mexico, one character is called the “old man of the festival.” However this character's mask can have a human face or animal features such as those of the monkey or goat.

=== Masks depicting Afro-Mexicans ===
A number of dances in several parts of Mexico include or feature masks imitating African or black faces. These have their origins with the importation of African slaves by the Spanish. These slaves had contact with the indigenous peoples, often as intermediaries between them and the Spanish overlords. This experience was incorporated in indigenous dances, with the dancers called “negritos” (little black ones). Negrito masks vary by region. Those from the Costa Chica region of Oaxaca and Guerrero have realistic or exaggerated Negroid features, and other from the Sierra de Juarez of Oaxaca are more primitive with small tusks protruding from the mouth. Those from Michoacán have fine features and a gentle expression. Sheepskin is often added to suggest hair. The masks are worn as part of a costume which usually has the dancer elegantly dressed, with colorful fabrics and headdresses. In the colonial period, blacks had a wide range of occupations so this was portrayed in dances. Although most of the Africans intermarried with the rest of the population, the masks remain.

=== Masks depicting devils and other fantastic creatures ===
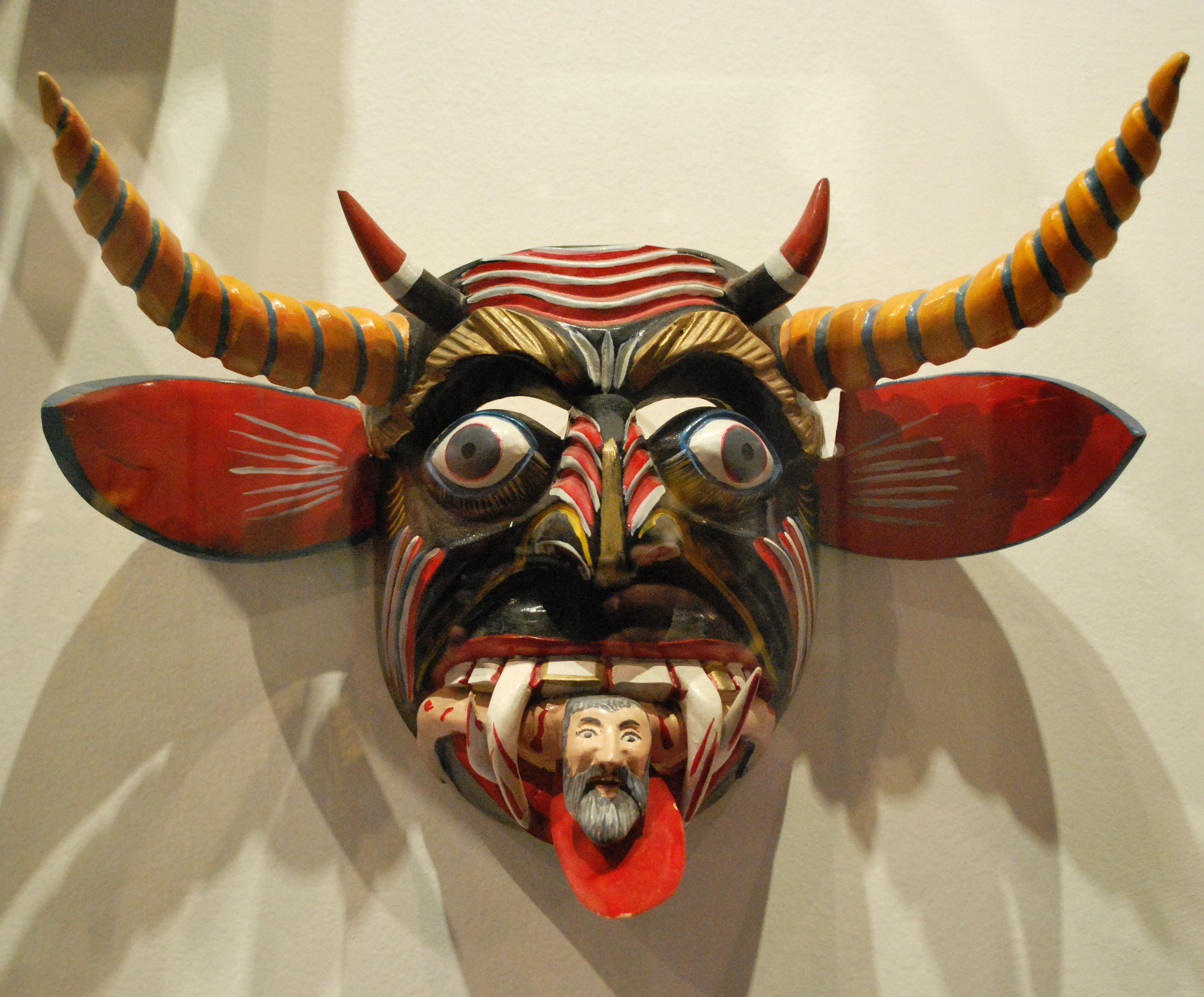
Traditional devils mask for the Pascuarela Play of Tócuaro, Michoacan

In addition to masks depicting humans and animals, other masks deal with the fantastic, abstract and supernatural. In the Nahua community of Zitlala, Guerrero, the mask for a ceremonial jester is red, with lizards on the cheek and sometimes the nose. Masks to indicate the indigenous in the Tastoanes dance often originally had scorpions painted on them, but evolved to include hooked noses and other grotesque features. Today the noses are made of wood and images of bikini-clad women are painted on. Skull masks have their origins in the pre-Hispanic period. The depiction of death in pre-Hispanic Mexico was not fearful but rather a part of life. Skull masks represent death still, and can be basic white or have fanciful decorations. Some are serious and others are laughing. Some masked characters represent abstract concepts such as time and the Seven Deadly Sins.

However, the most common fantastic masks are those which depict the devils, demons and Satan himself. These vary from near normal human faces to those with wild and/or grotesque features, along with human features, animal features or both. Depictions of old pre-Hispanic gods remain in masks. Tlaloc was commonly depicted as having serpents around his eyes and the fangs of a viper. These elements can be found in devil masks today. Tezcatlipoca was a night god whose colors were black and red. These colors are also applied to devil masks.

Depictions of demons and devils have been adopted in various dances and rituals from morality plays to satires. Satan appears in dances such as Los Tecuanes and Moors and Christians as well as in Carnival celebrations. Christmas pageants called pastorelas have masked devil characters that try to keep shepherds from seeing the Baby Jesus.

== Bibliography ==
- Ruth D. Lechuga (1995). Máscaras tradicionales de México (in Spanish). Mexico City: Banco Nacional de Obras y Servicios Públicos. ISBN 0-8118-0811-4.
- Ruth D. Lechuga; Chloe Sayer (1995). Mask Arts of Mexico. San Francisco: Chronicle Books. ISBN 0-8118-0811-4.
- Barbara Mauldin (1999). Masks of Mexico: Tigers, Devils and the Dance of Life. Santa Fe: Museum of New Mexico Press. ISBN 0-89013-329-8.
- Máscaras (in Spanish). Mexico City: MAPFRE. 1991.
