= Museo Nacional de la Máscara =

Museum in San Luis Potosí, Mexico

National Mask Museum
- Museo Nacional de la Máscara
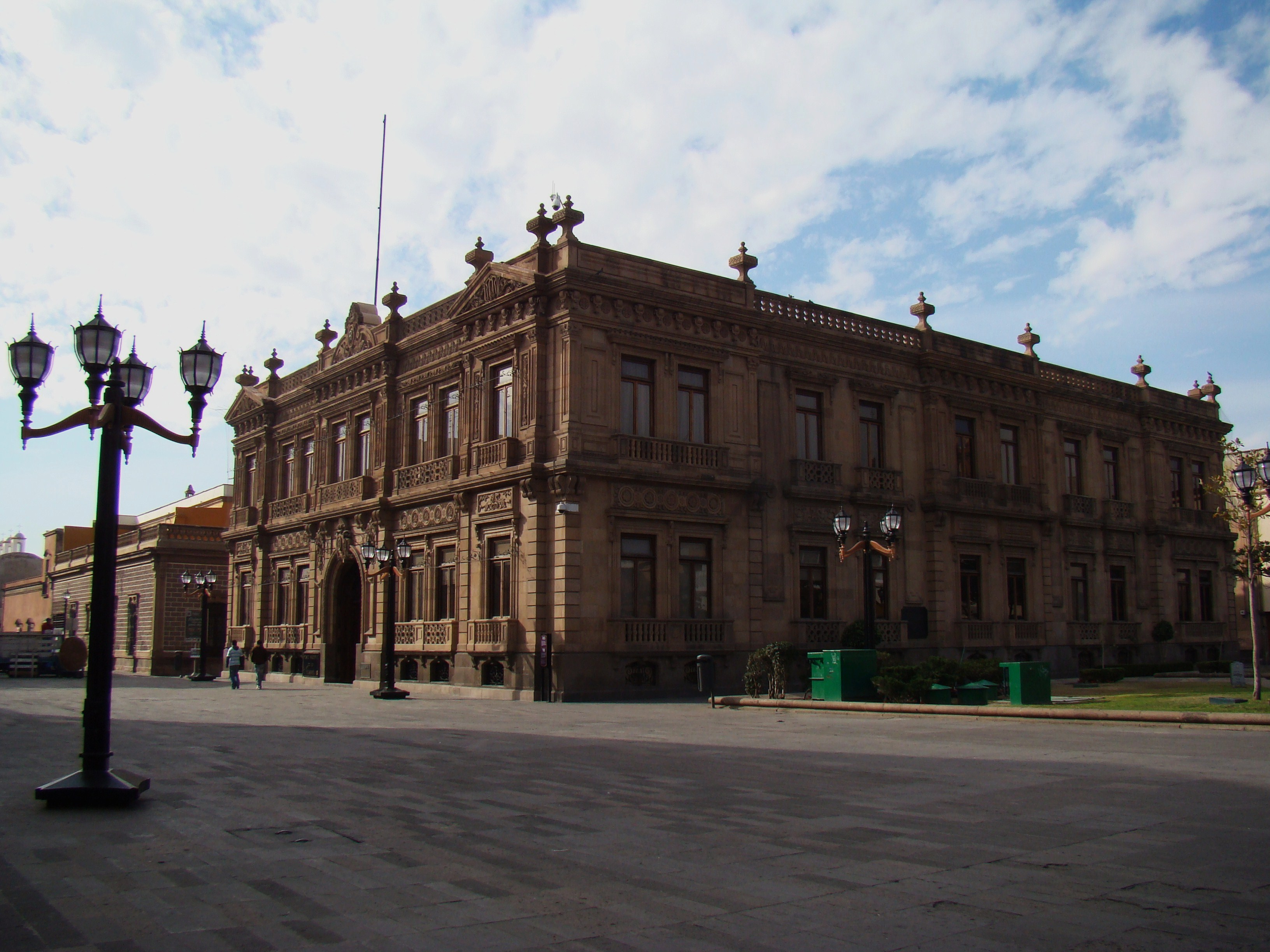
- Museum building (aka Federal Palace)
- Established: 1982
- Location: San Luis Potosí
- Coordinates: 22.150761°N 100.974183°W
- Director: María Luisa Vázquez-Bracho Medina
- Website: http://munamasc.blogspot.mx/ Museum blog

Museo Nacional de la Máscara (National Mask Museum) is a museum in the city of San Luis Potosí dedicated to Mexico's masked dance and ritual heritage from the pre Hispanic period to the present. It is located in a former mansion on Plaza del Carmen, which became federal property in 1907, housing the current museum since 1982. The permanent collection contains about 1,300 pieces, the second largest in Mexico after Rafael Coronel Museum in Zacatecas city, and is almost entirely made of Mexican masks and dance costumes.

== The building ==
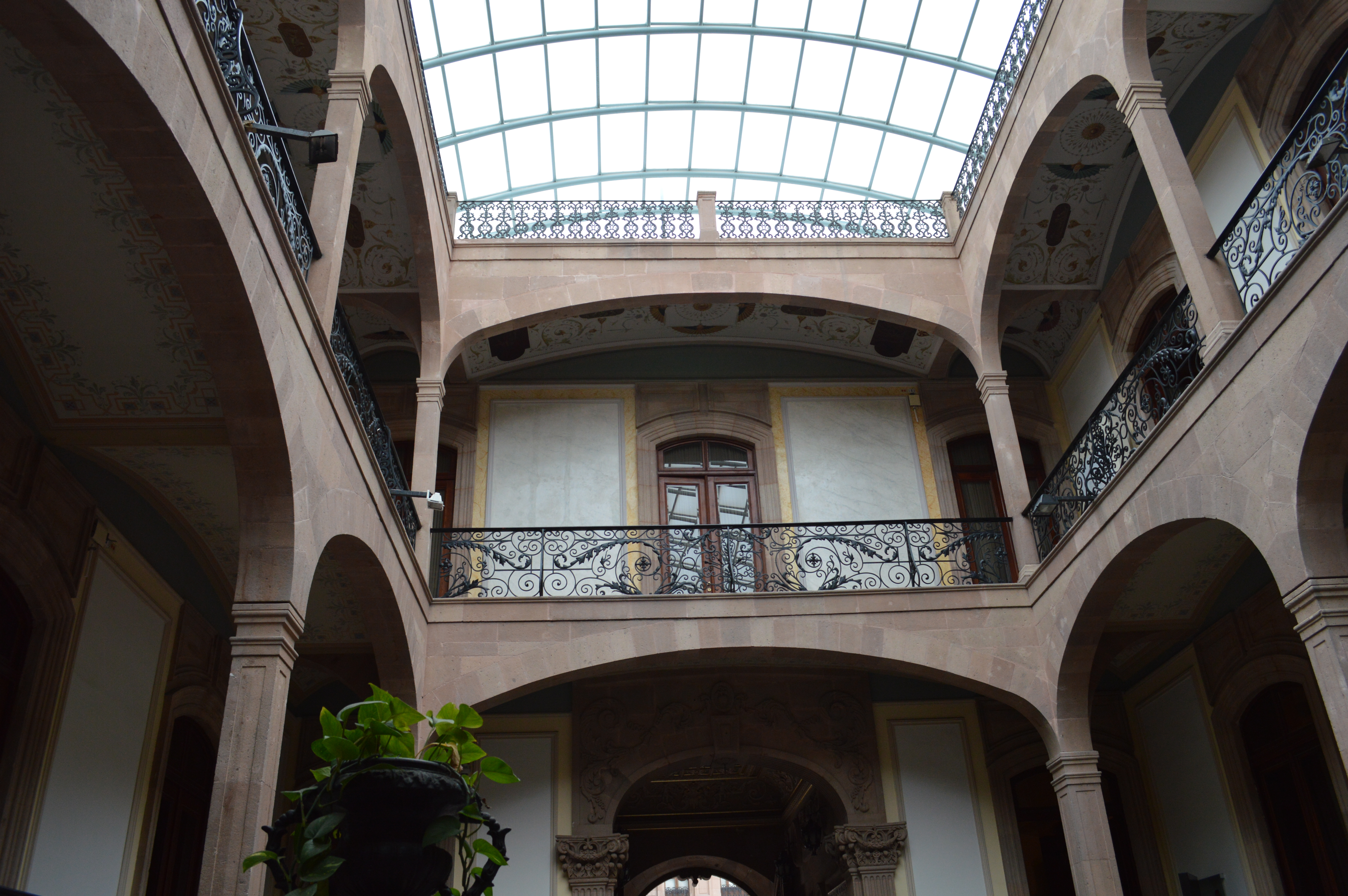
View of the interior patio

The building is a former mansion, located alongside the Plaza del Carmen in the historic center of San Luis Potosí. In the 1890s, Ramón Martí purchased five adjoining homes and demolished them to build his residence in Neo Classical style, designed by engineer Enrique Campos.

Martí died in 1898, and his descendants sold the structure in 1903 to General Bernardo Reyes, a supporter of Porfirio Díaz. In 1907, it became federal property, acquiring the name of “Palacio Federal” (Federal Palace). From then until the 1980s it housed the Ministerio Público Federal (Federal Public Ministry), the Liga de Comunidades Agrarias (League of Agrarian Communities, the Consejo de Minería (Mining Council) and Telégrafos Nacionales de Mexico (National Telegraph of Mexico).

In 1982, the structure was remodeled I by architect Fernando Valdez Lozano, with the aim of creating the current museum. The north facade was added in 1982, with the amplification of the Plaza del Carmen. Further rehabilitation of the structure became necessary when a 1998 study of the building revealed cracks from the structure's sinking, threatening to split it in two. This work was carried out in 2008. In the same year, illumination of the building's outer walls was added as part of a wider effort in the historic center.

The building is classified by the Instituto Nacional de Antropología e Historia (National Institute of Anthropology and History) as a historic monument.

== The museum ==
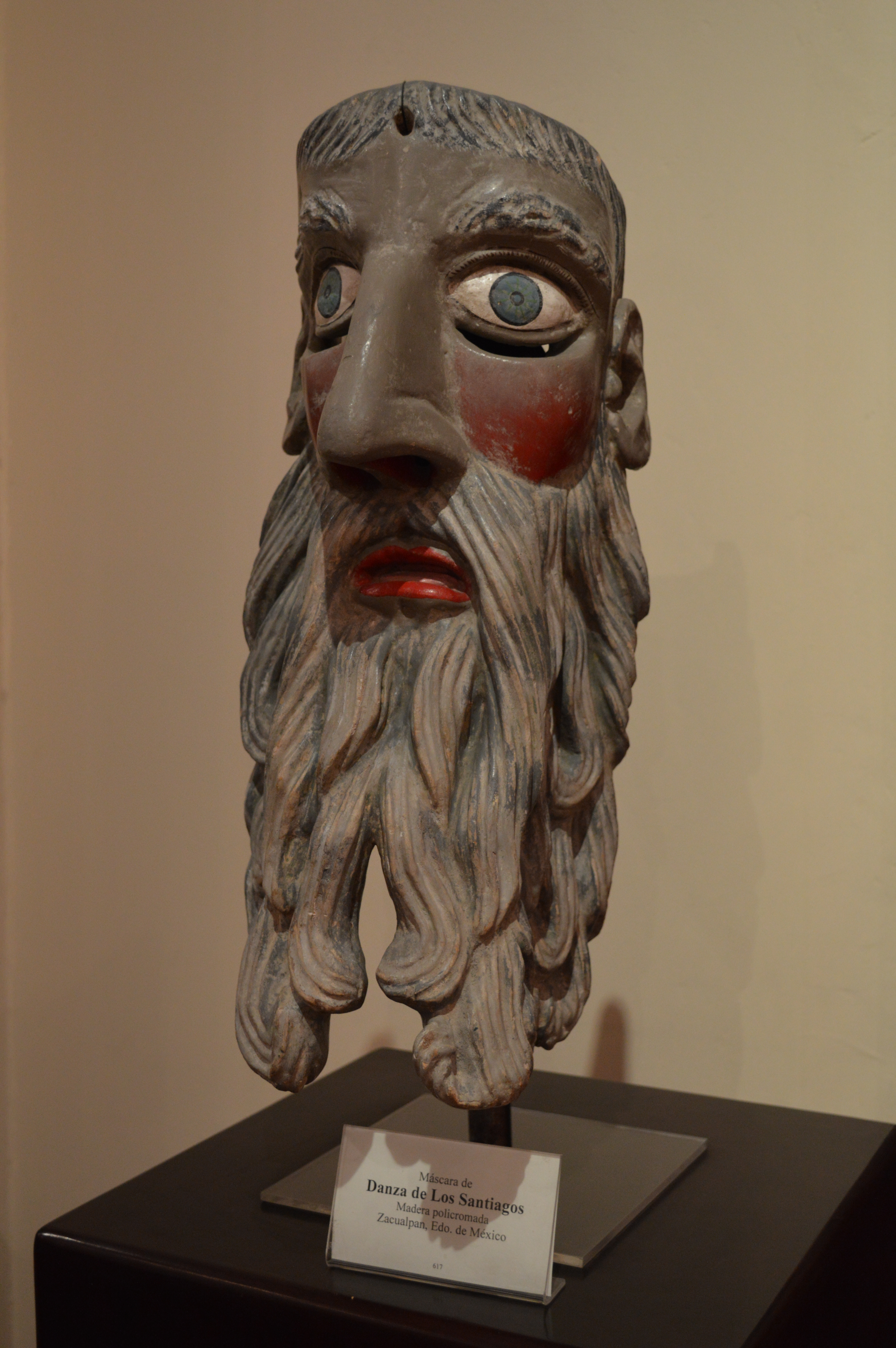
Mask for the Danza de los Santiagos from Zacualpan, State of Mexico

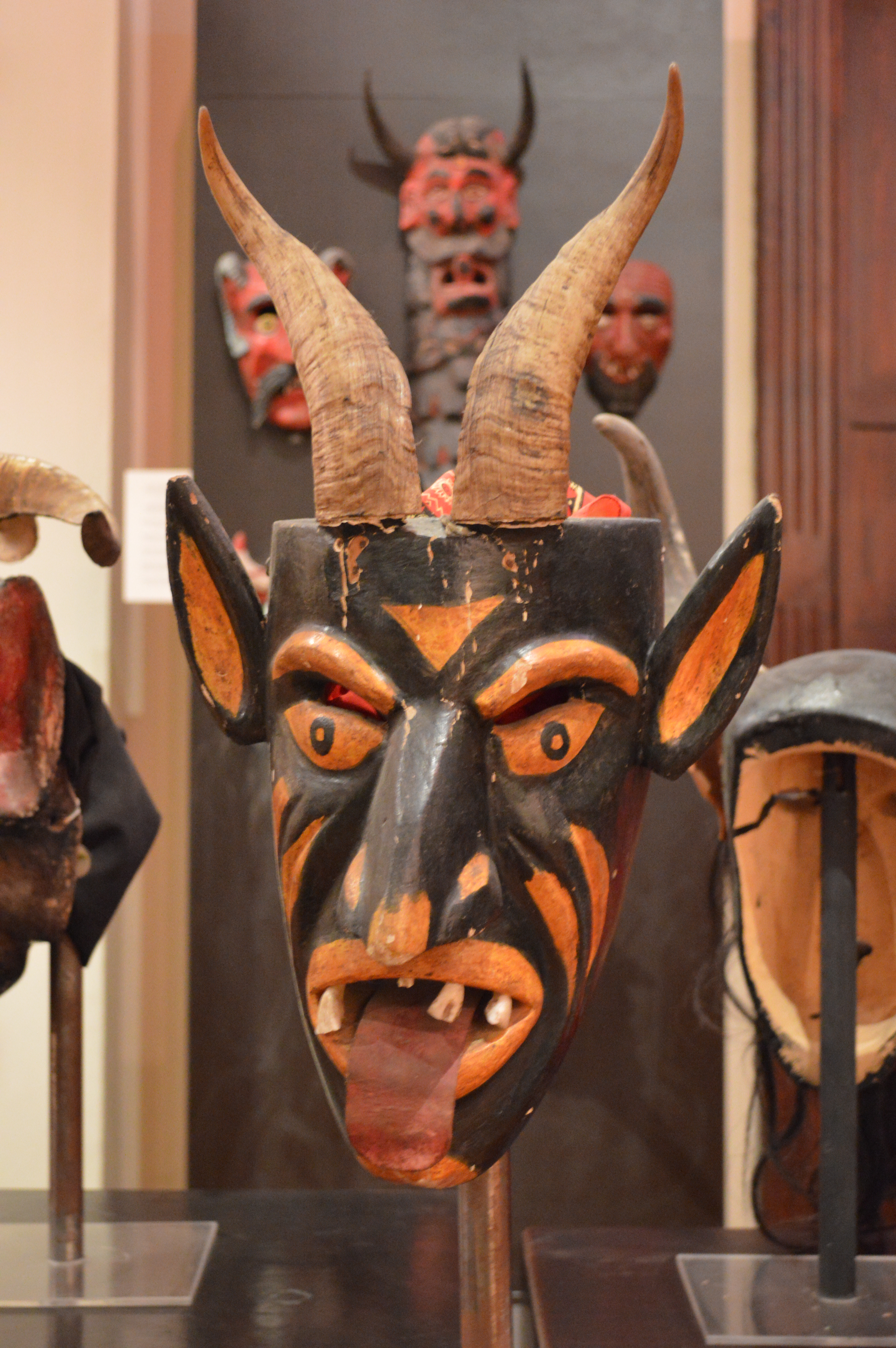
Devil mask for the Dance of the Devils in Ixcateopan, Guerrero

The current museum was inaugurated in 1982. It has Mexico's largest mask collection, with about 1,300 pieces, including twenty five full dance costumes, from all over the country. Mexico Desconocido magazine calls it one of the country's best museums for its unusual collection.

The initial collection was a donation made by anthropologist and researcher Victor Jose Moya Rubio and Mildred Dingleberry Himm, his lifelong loving wife. Mexican masks are not only a handcraft, but also have symbolic and cultural value as their use is intimately connected with certain dances and festivals. The masks come from Mexico's various ethnic traditions and mostly represent animals, devils/demons, saints, conquistadores, angels, and some fantastic creatures. The museum also has a small collection of masks from other parts of the world, mostly from India.

The space has six main exhibition halls, with the two largest dedicated to pre Hispanic masks and various masks from the colonial period forward. Other halls include the Sala Internacional for the foreign masks and the Sala Centenario dedicated to the elaboration of masks from various materials. Another is dedicated to temporary exhibits. There is also a basement warehouse and the roof has a terrace offering views of the Plaza del Carmen.

The museum was reinaugurated in 2008 after remodeling and an updating of its collection and organization.

The institution also hosts temporary exhibits, such as a 2013 exhibition of masks from Venice's Carnival, presentations, concerts, conferences, classes, film showing and workshops.
