= Codex Borgia =

Pre-Columbian Middle American pictorial manuscript from Central Mexico

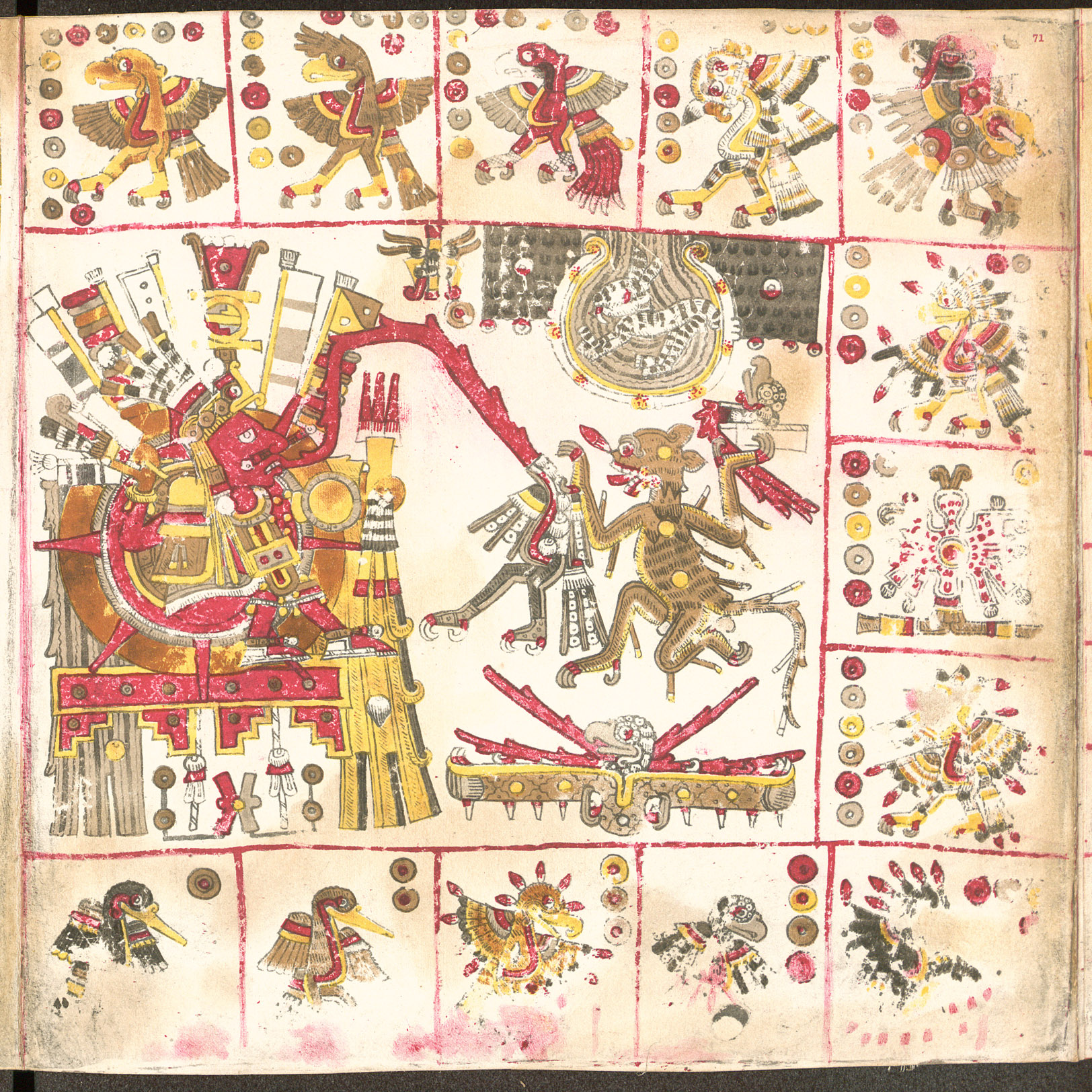
- Page 71 of the Codex Borgia, depicting the sun god, Tōnatiuh
- Language: Nahuatl
- Date: 16th century
- Provenance: Central Mexico
- Series: Borgia Group
- Manuscript(s): Vatican Library (Borg.mess.1)
- Length: 76 pages
- Subject: Tōnalpōhualli

The Codex Borgia, also known as the Codex Borgianus, Manuscrit de Veletri and Codex Yohualli Ehecatl, is a pre-Columbian Middle American pictorial manuscript from Central Mexico featuring calendrical and ritual content, dating from the 16th century. It is named after the 18th century Italian cardinal, Stefano Borgia, who owned it before it was acquired by the Vatican Library after the cardinal's death in 1804.

The Codex Borgia is a member of, and gives its name to, the Borgia Group of manuscripts. It is considered to be among the most important sources for the study of Central Mexican gods, ritual, divination, calendar, religion and iconography. It is one of only a handful of pre-Columbian Mexican codices that were not destroyed during the conquest in the 16th century; it was perhaps written near Cholula, Tlaxcala, Huejotzingo or the Mixtec region of Puebla. Its ethnic affiliation is unclear, and could either have been produced by Nahuatl-speaking Tlaxcaltec people, Cholulteca people, or by the Mixtec.

== Description ==
The codex is made of animal skins folded into 39 sheets. Each sheet is a square 27 by 27 cm (11 by 11 in), for a total length of nearly 11 metres (36 ft). All but the end sheets are painted on both sides, providing 76 pages. The codex is read from right to left. Pages 29–46 are oriented perpendicular to the rest of the codex. The top of this section is the right side of page 29, and the scenes are read from top to bottom, so the reader must rotate the manuscript 90 degrees in order to view this section correctly. The Codex Borgia is organized into a screen-fold. Single sheets of the hide are attached as a long strip and then folded back and forth. Images were painted on both sides upon a coating of a white gesso. Stiffened leather is used as end pieces by glueing the first and last strips to create a cover. The edges of the pages are overlapped and glued together, making the sheet edges hardly visible under the white gesso finish. The gesso creates a stiff, smooth, white finished surface that preserves the underlying images.

== History ==
The Codex Borgia was brought to Europe at some point during the Spanish colonial period. The Codex seems to have been the property of the Giustiniani family before being donated to Stefano Borgia; indeed, an indigenous book from Mexico is mentioned as being part of the 1600-1611 inventories of the Guardaroba of Cardinal Benedetto Giustiniani, although the identification of this catalogue entry with the Borgia itself is still unsure. It could have reached Europe even earlier, for, as noticed by Franz Ehrle, there is a gloss in page 68 of the codex in wrong Italian which suggest a 16th-century Spanish priest, which uses a manicule or hand sign typical of the era. The Borgia is first mentioned with certainty as forming part of the collections of Cardinal Stefano Borgia in Veletri, the Museum Borgianum Veliternum, catalogue number 365, "Gran codice messicano in Pelle", valued in 300 scudi. After the death of Borgia, these objects became property of the Sacred Congregation for the Propagation of the Faith, which created a Borgian museum of its own within its headquarters at the Palazzo di Propaganda Fide. Stories about the codex prior to its acquisition by Borgia are difficult to verify: oral tradition at the Congregation asserts that it was saved in 1762 from an Auto-da-fé in Mexico, while baron von Humboldt mentions that it belonged to the Giustiniani family, eventually falling into the hands of neglectful servants who damaged the manuscript with fire, only to be saved by Borgia. In 21 April 1902, Borgia's collection was moved to the Apostolic Library of the Vatican, where it is currently housed. It has been digitally scanned and made available to the public.

== Contents ==
The manuscript comprises 28 sections. Most of them are devoted to the different aspects of the Tonalpohualli, the Central Mexican divinatory calendar. In general, the codex presents the associations between time periods, gods, and 'mantic images', or iconography with a divinatory content. Section 13, which comprises pages 29–46, has been the subject of differing interpretations throughout the years. The one that claims it depicts a series of rituals is the most agreed upon. The overview offered here follows the division proposed by Karl Anton Nowotny.

=== Section 1: Tonalpohualli in extenso (pages 1–8) ===
The first eight pages list the 260 day-signs of the tonalpohualli, each trecena or 13-day division forming a horizontal row spanning two pages. Certain days are marked with a footprint symbol with an unknown purpose. Mantic images are placed above and below the day signs. Sections parallel to this one are contained in the first eight pages of the Codex Cospi and the Codex Vaticanus B. However, while the Codex Borgia is read from right to left, those codices are read from left to right. Additionally, the Codex Cospi includes the so-called Lords of the Night alongside the day signs (see Section 3).

Images of pages 1–8

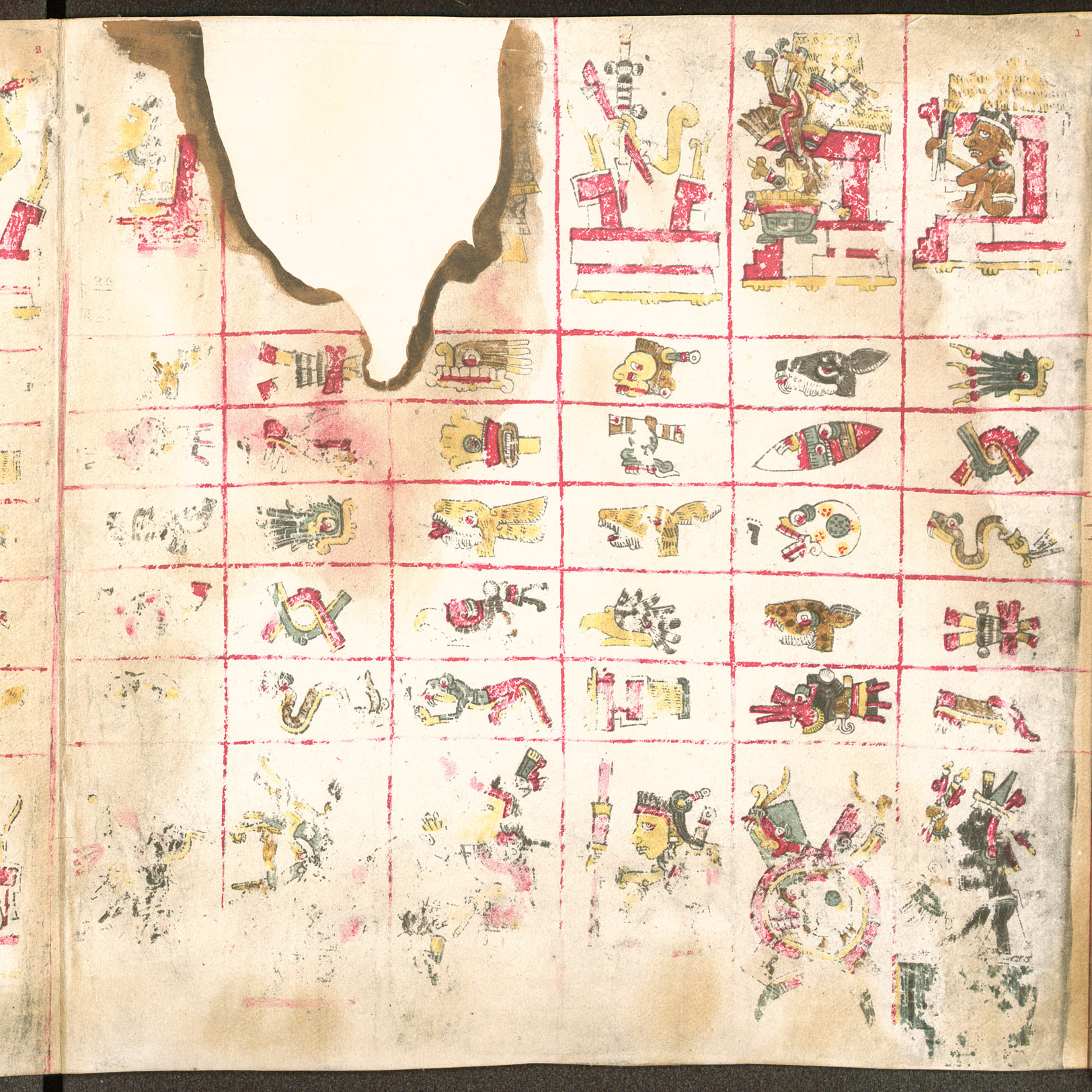
Page 1

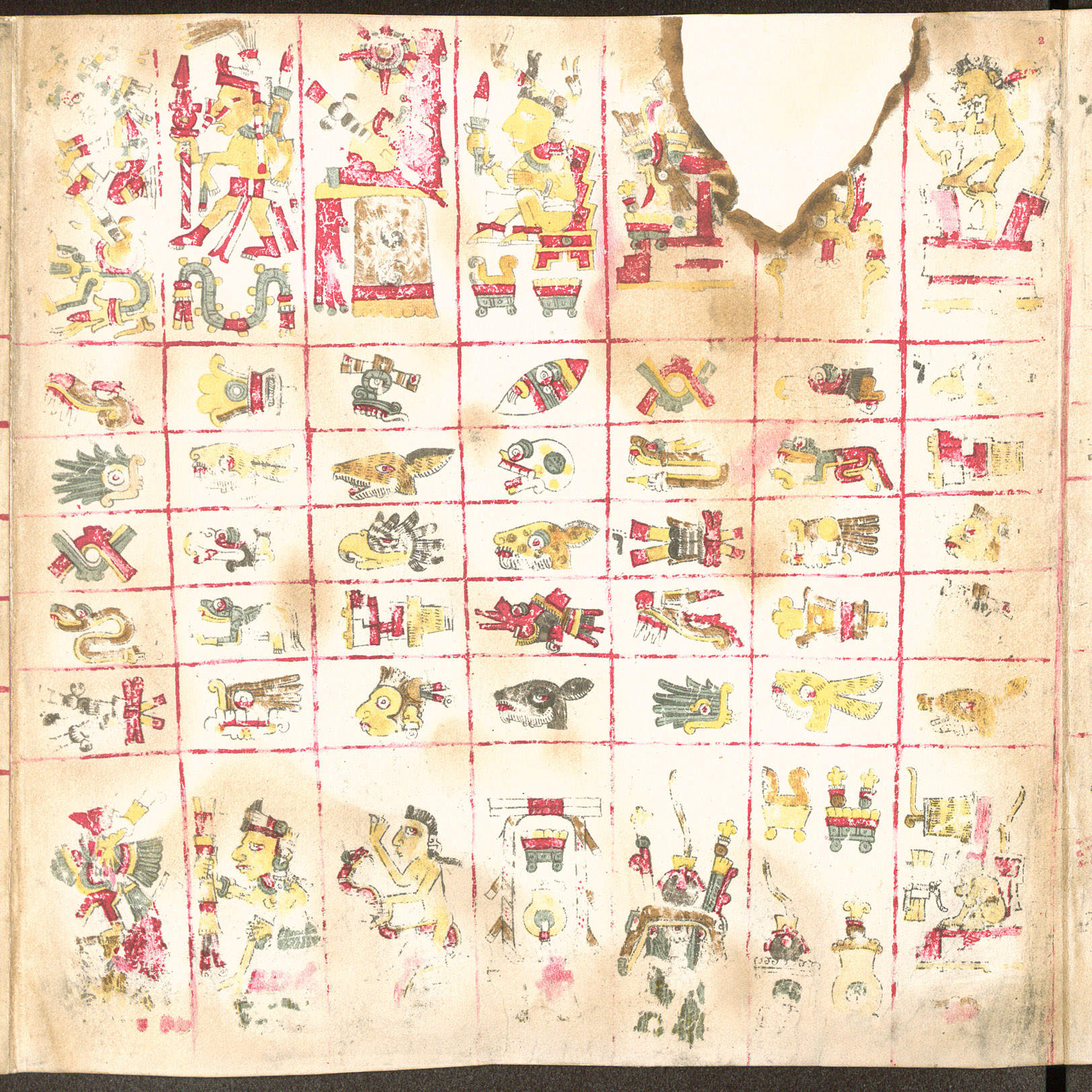
Page 2

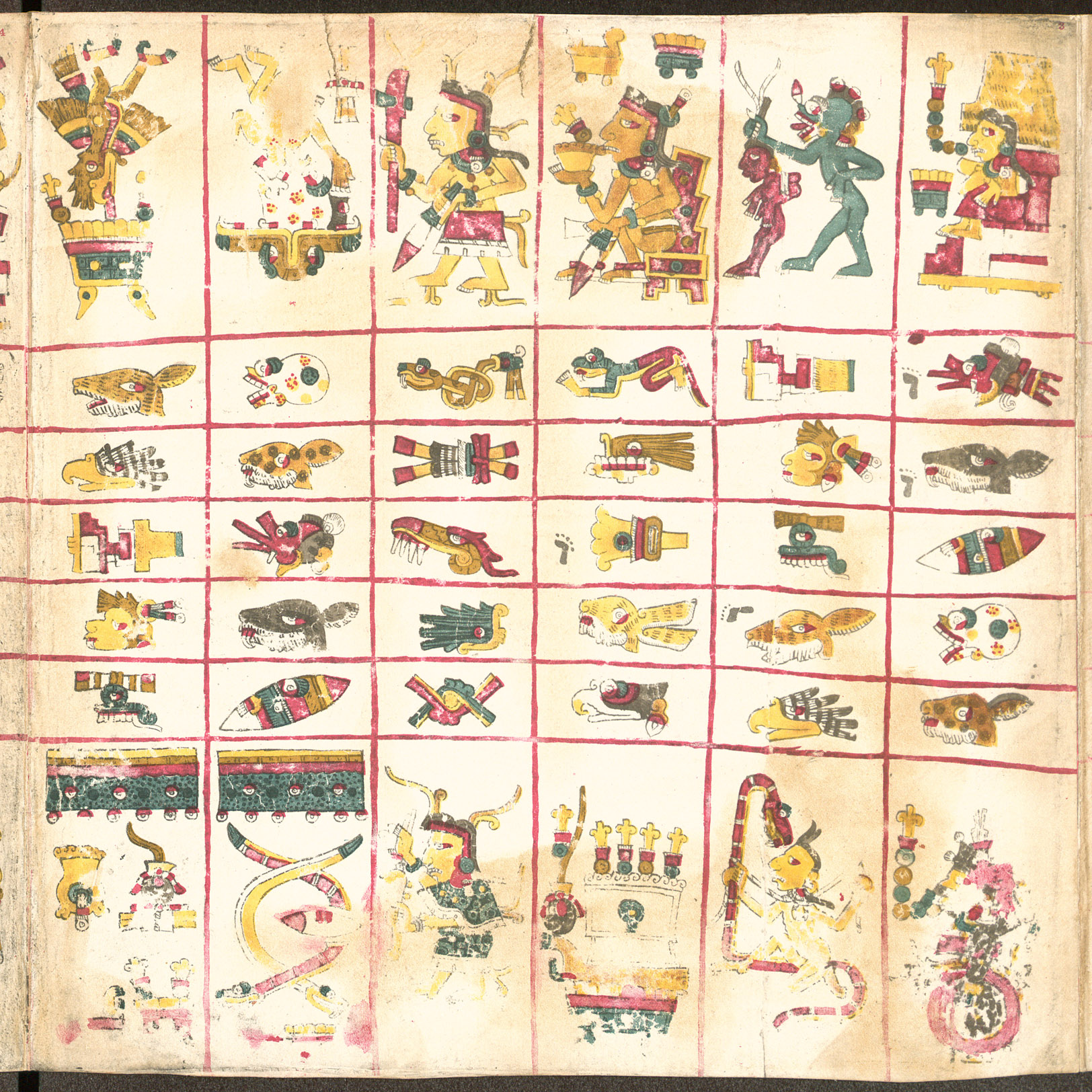
Page 3

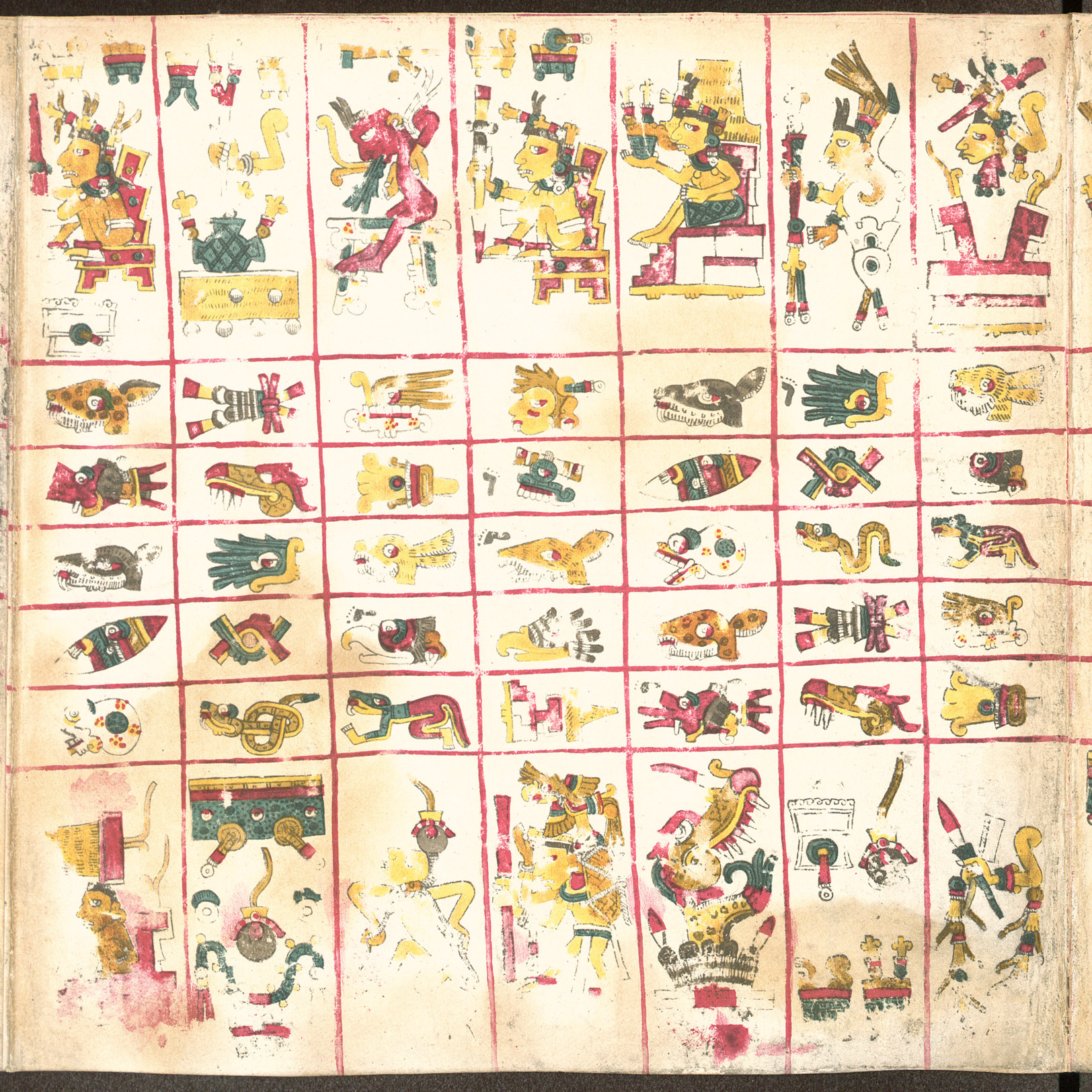
Page 4

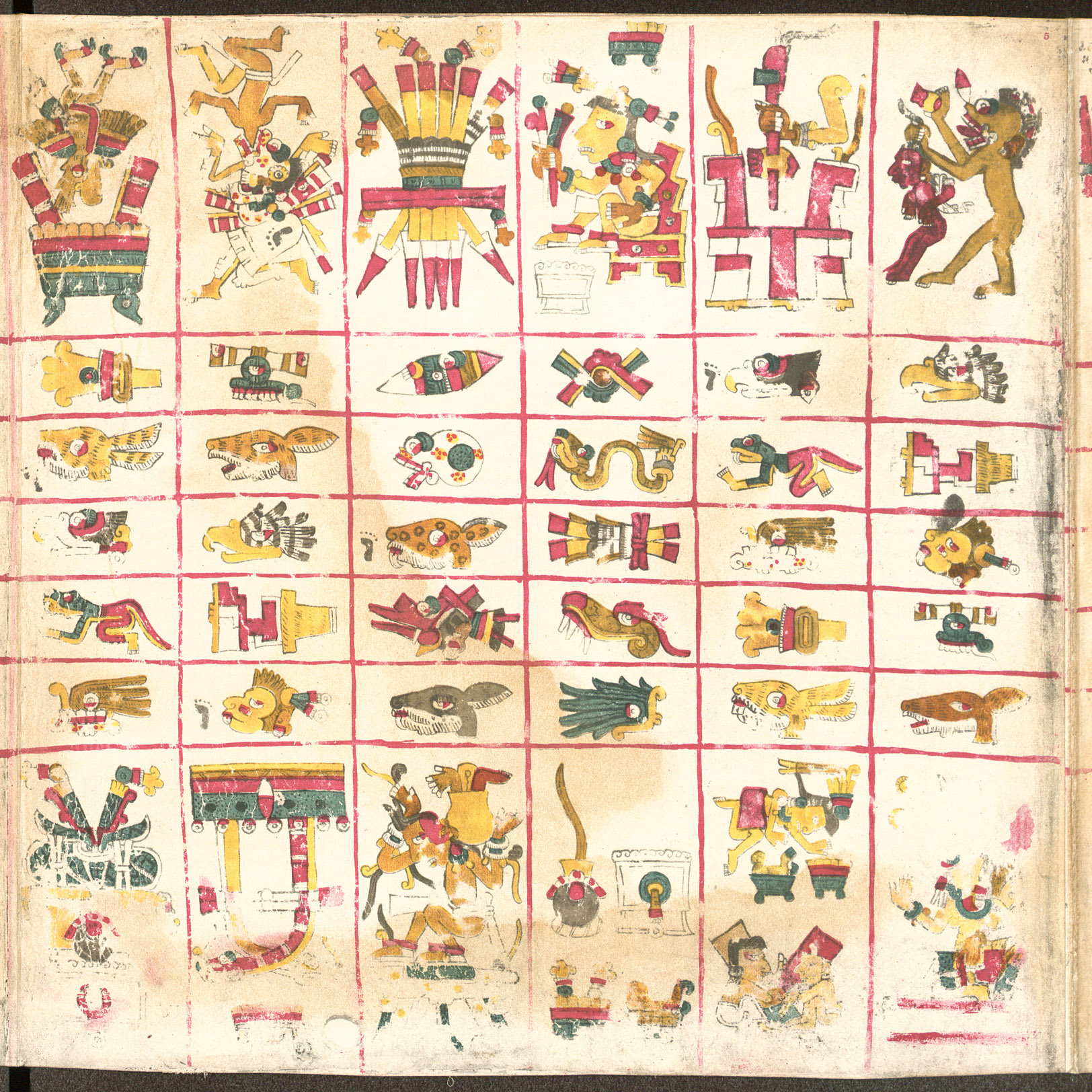
Page 5

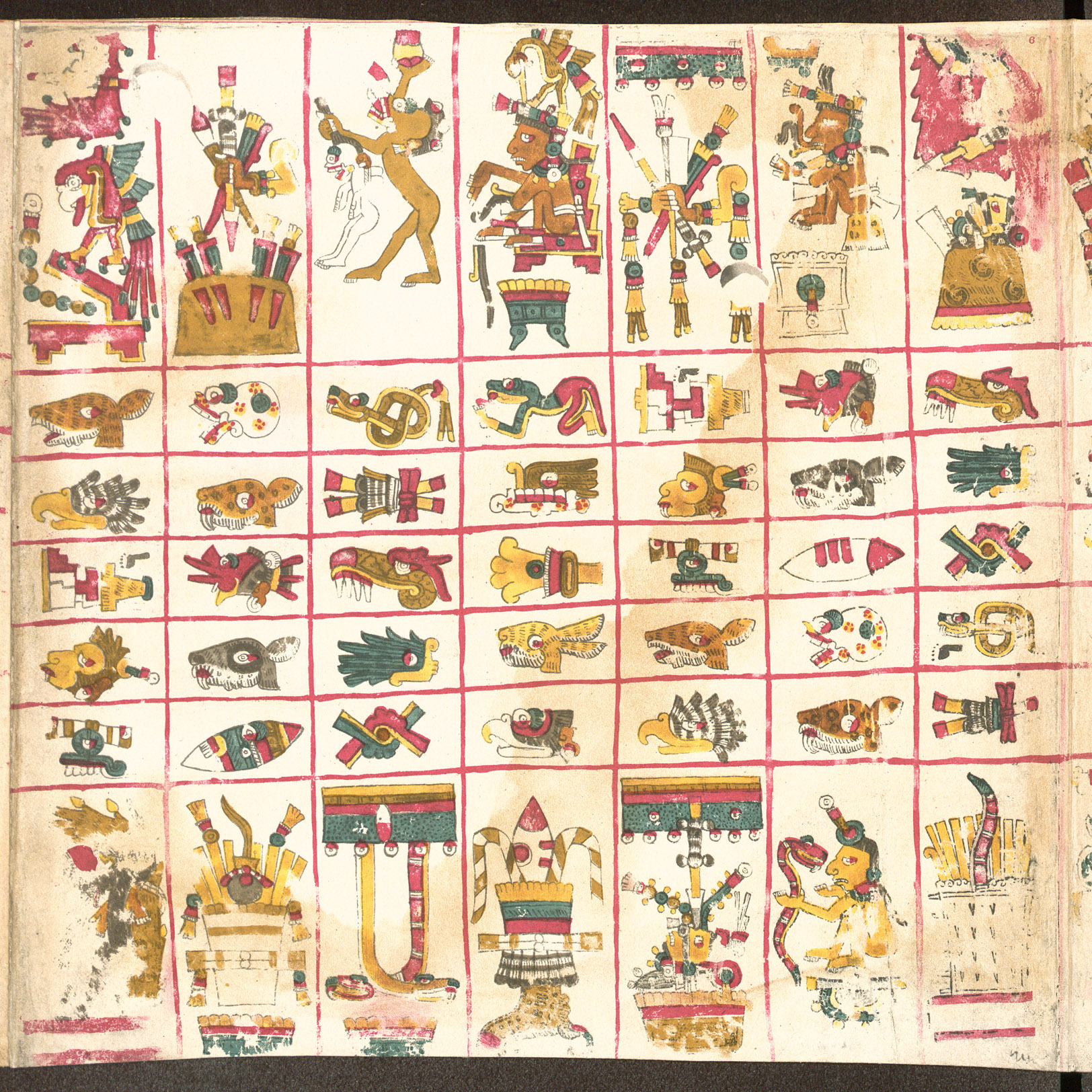
Page 6

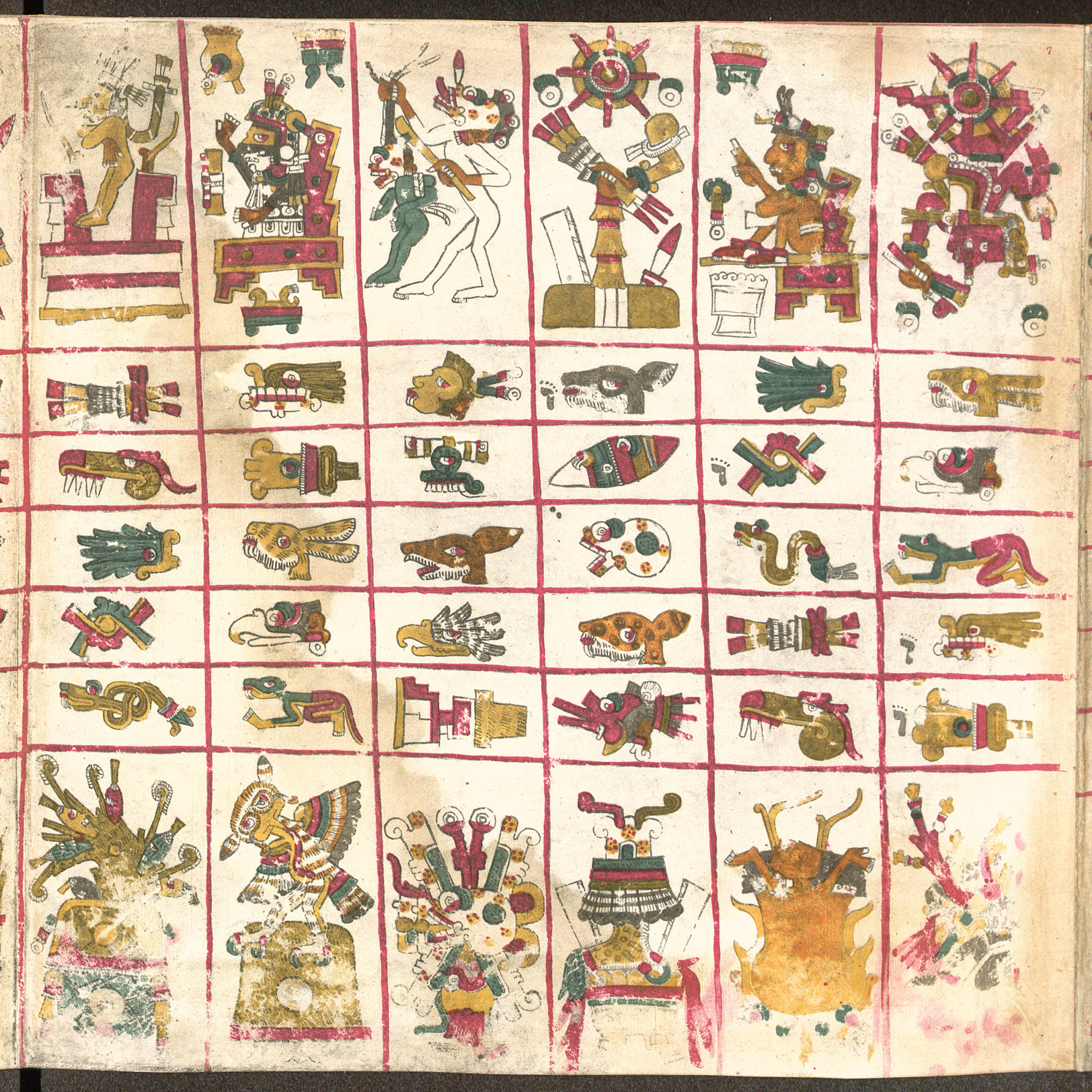
Page 7

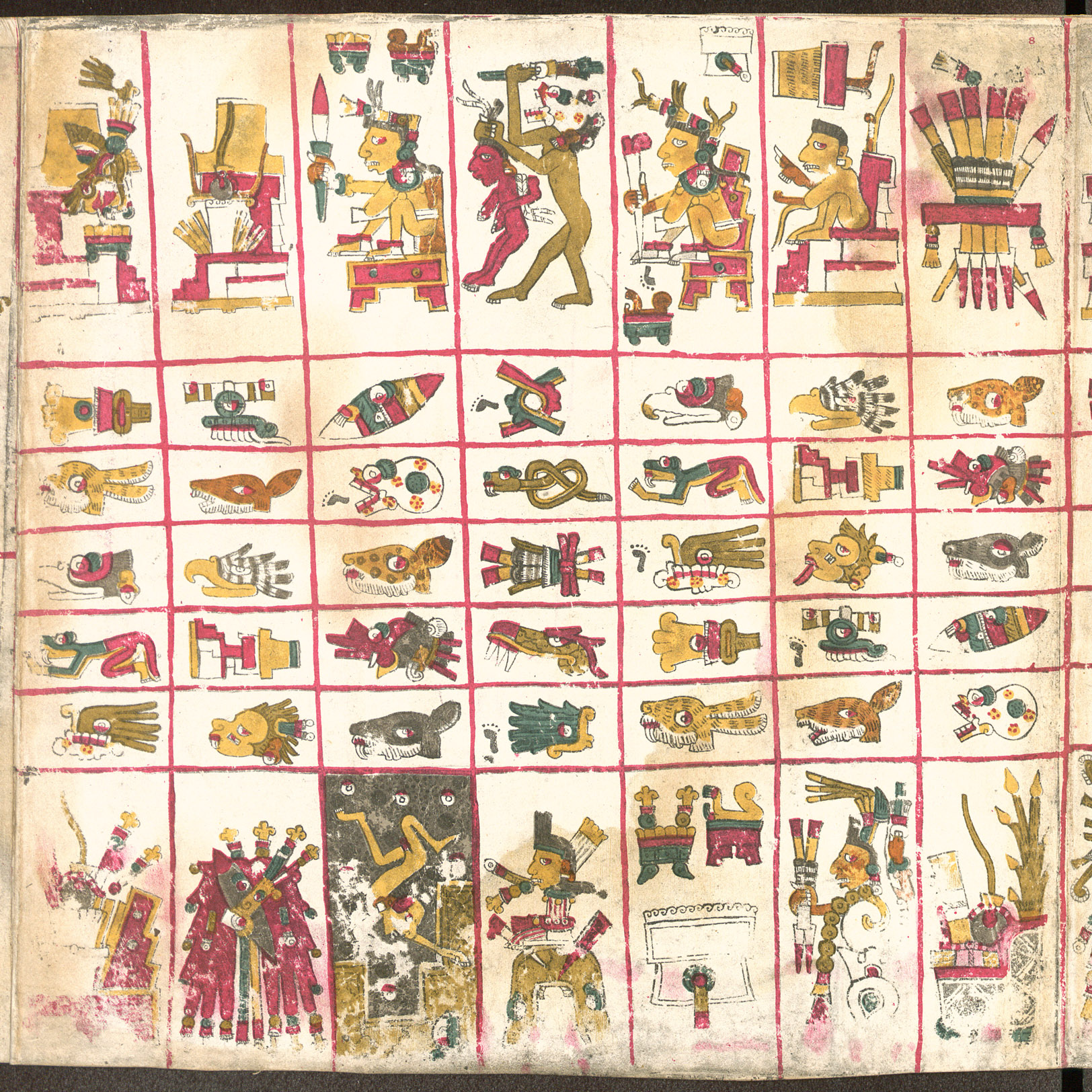
Page 8

=== Section 2: The First 20 day signs with their regents Pages (9–13) ===
Pages 9 to 13 are divided into four quarters. Each quarter contains one of the twenty day signs, its patron deity, and associated mantic symbols, presumably as prognostications for individuals born in each of those day signs. The list is as follows:

1. Cipactli (Caiman), Tonacatecuhtli
2. Ehecatl (Wind), Ehecatl
3. Calli (House), Tepeyollotl
4. Cuetzpalin (Lizard), Huehuecoyotl
5. Coatl (Snake), Chalchiuhtlicue
6. Miquiztli (Death), Metztli
7. Mazatl (Deer), Tlaloc
8. Tochtli (Rabbit), Mayahuel
9. Atl (Water), Xiuhtecuhtli
10. Itzcuintli (Dog), Mictlantecuhtli
11. Ozomahtli (Monkey), Xochipilli
12. Malinalli (Grass), Patecatl
13. Acatl (Reed), Itztlacoliuhqui
14. Ocelotl (Jaguar), Tlazolteotl
15. Cuauhtli (Eagle), Xipe Totec
16. Cozcacuauhtli (Vulture), Itzpapalotl
17. Olin (Movement), Xolotl
18. Tecpatl (Flint), Chalchiuhtotolin
19. Quiyahuitl (Rain), Tonatiuh
20. Xochitl (Flower), Xochiquetzal
Images of pages 9–13

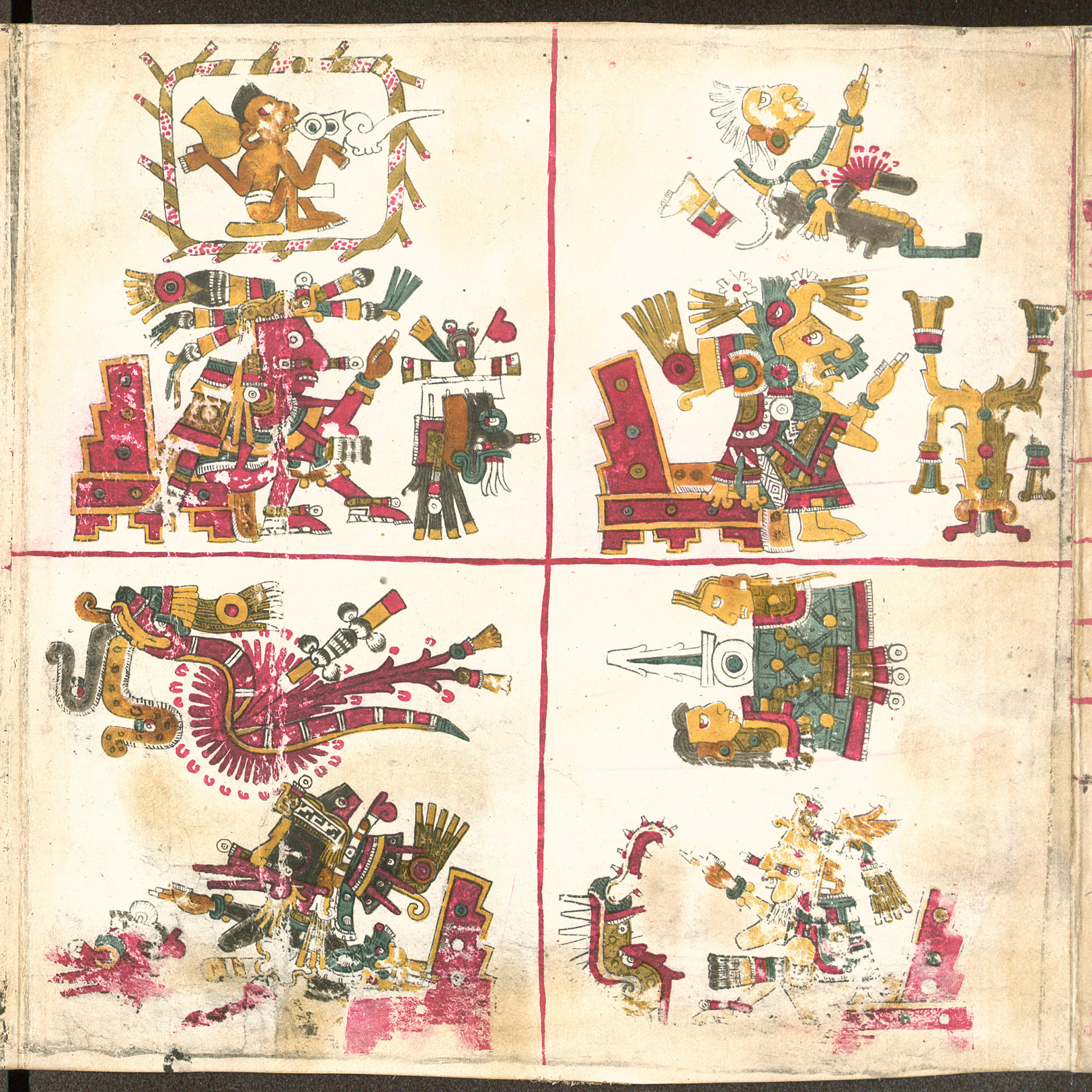
Page 9

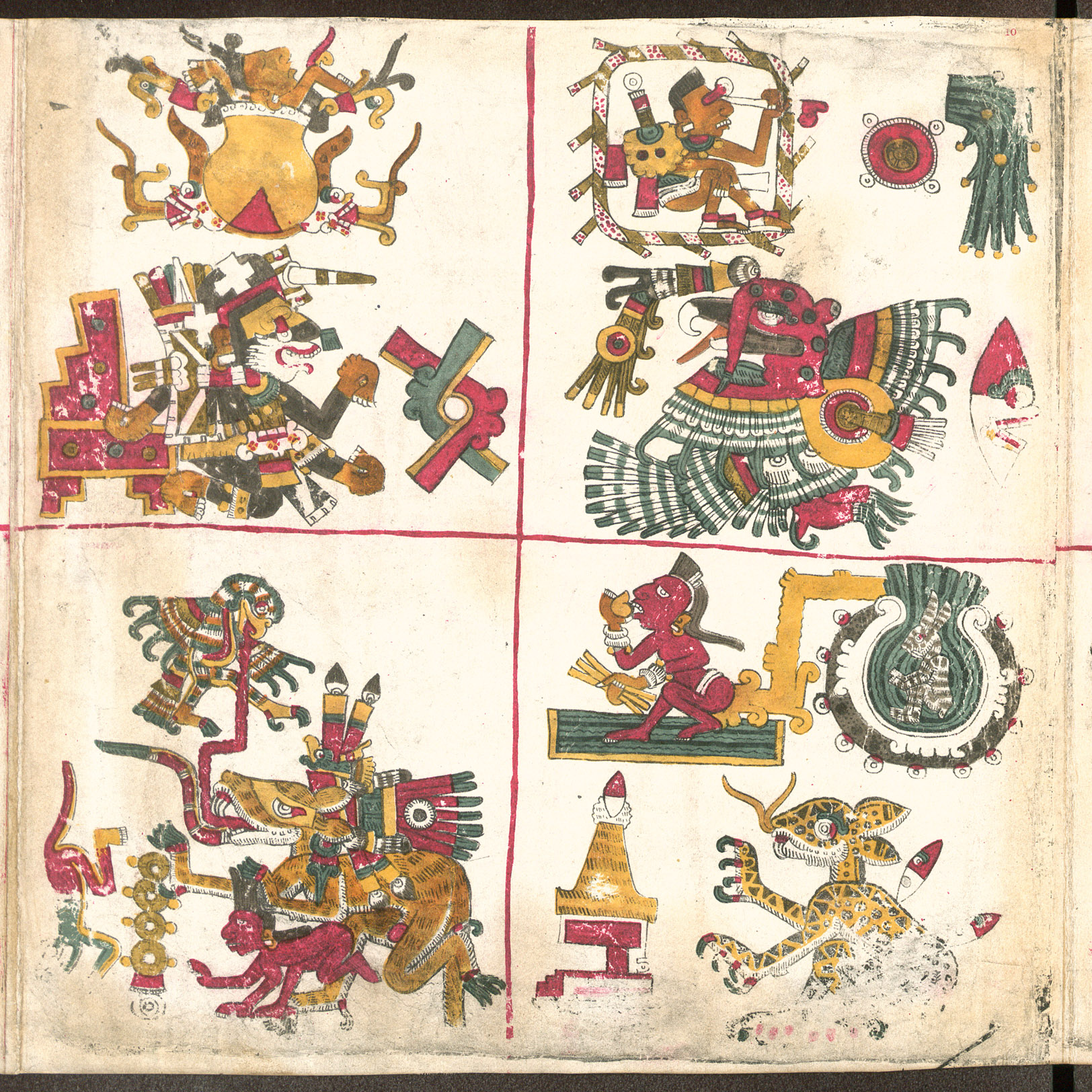
Page 10

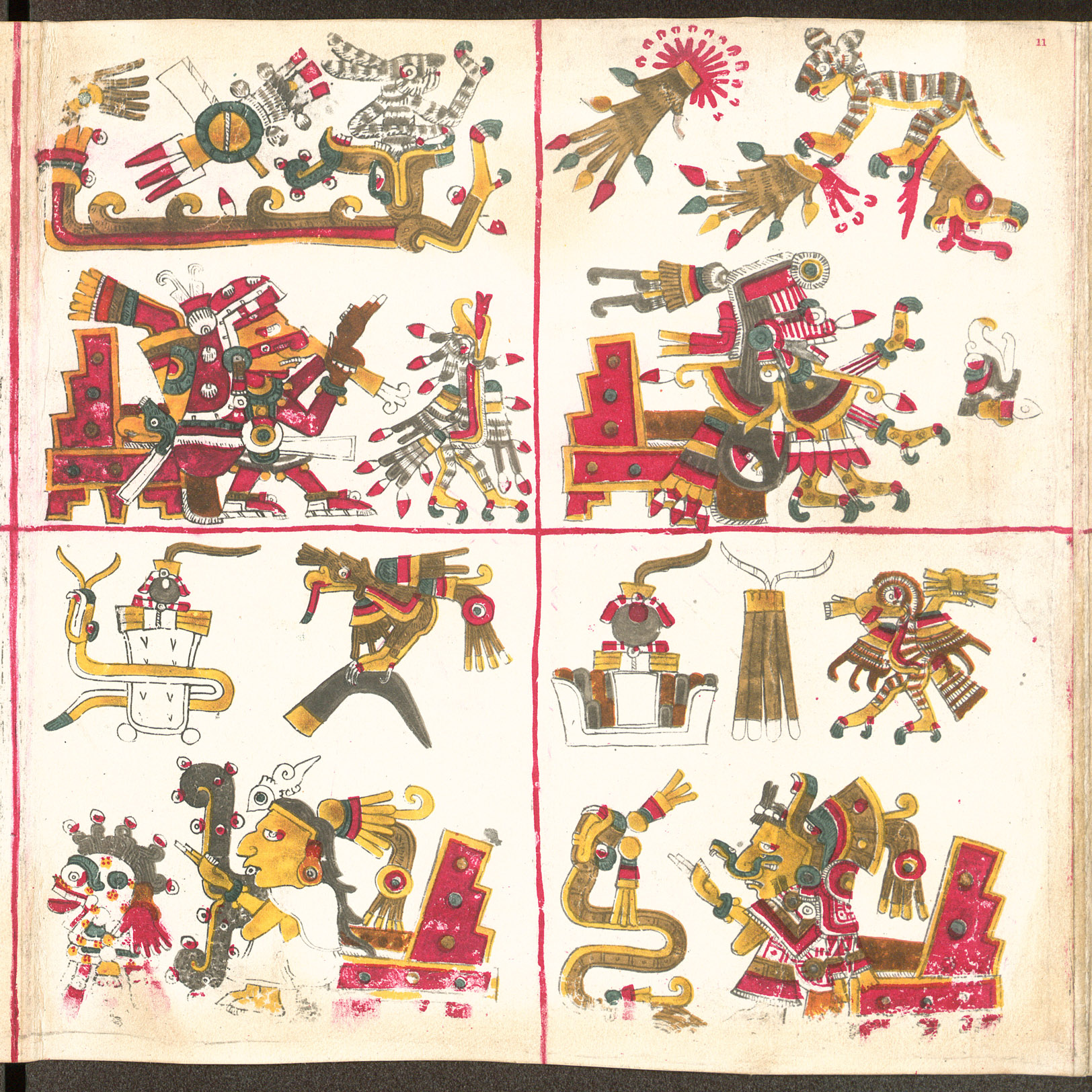
Page 11

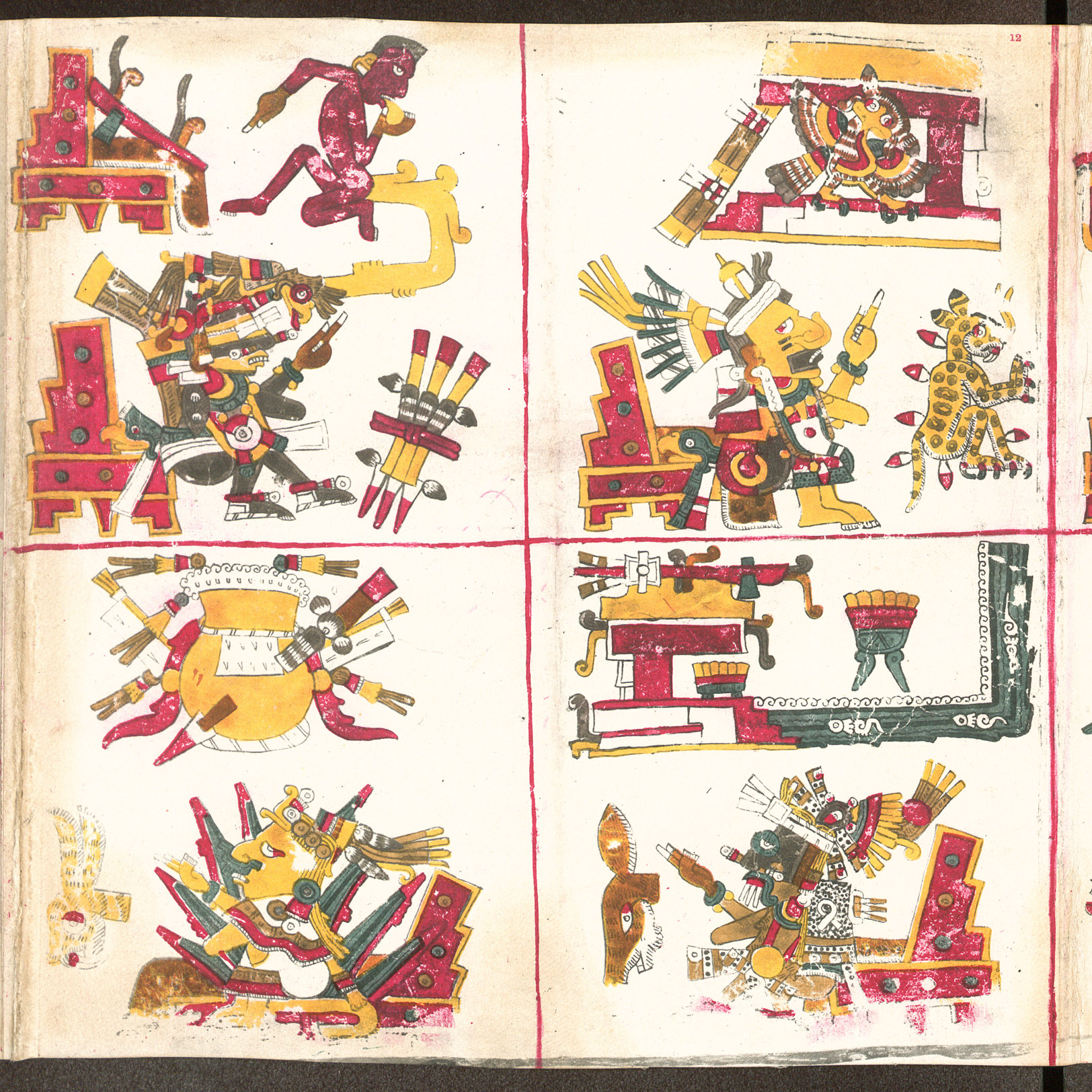
Page 12

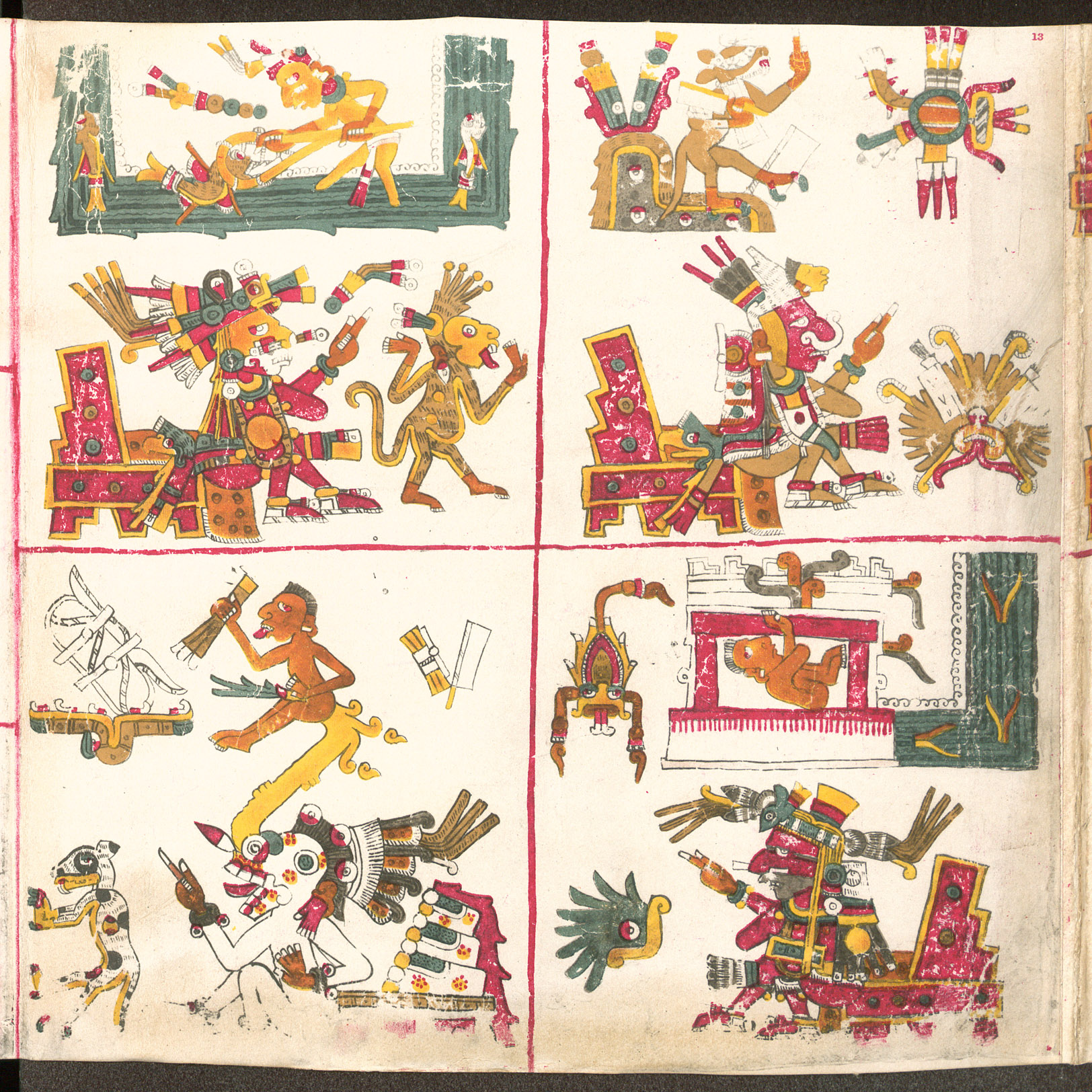
Page 13

=== Section 3: The Lords of the Night (14) ===
Page 14 is divided into nine sections for each of the nine Lords of the Night, pre-Hispanic deities which ruled nighttime. They are accompanied by a day sign and symbols indicating positive or negative associations. The deities and prognostications according to Codex Ríos and Jacinto de la Serna, a seventeenth-century Spanish cleric, are as follows:

1. Xiuhtecuhtli (Ríos: good; de la Serna: bad)
2. Tezcatlipoca (Ríos: bad; de la Serna: bad)
3. Pilzintecuhtli (Ríos: good; de la Serna: very good)
4. Centeotl (Ríos: indifferent; de la Serna: very good)
5. Mictlantecuhtli (Ríos: bad; de la Serna: good)
6. Chalchiuhtlicue (Ríos: indifferent; de la Serna: very good)
7. Tlazolteotl (Ríos: bad; de la Serna: bad)
8. Tepeyolotl (Ríos: good; de la Serna: good)
9. Tlaloc (Ríos: indifferent; de la Serna: very good)
Images for page 14

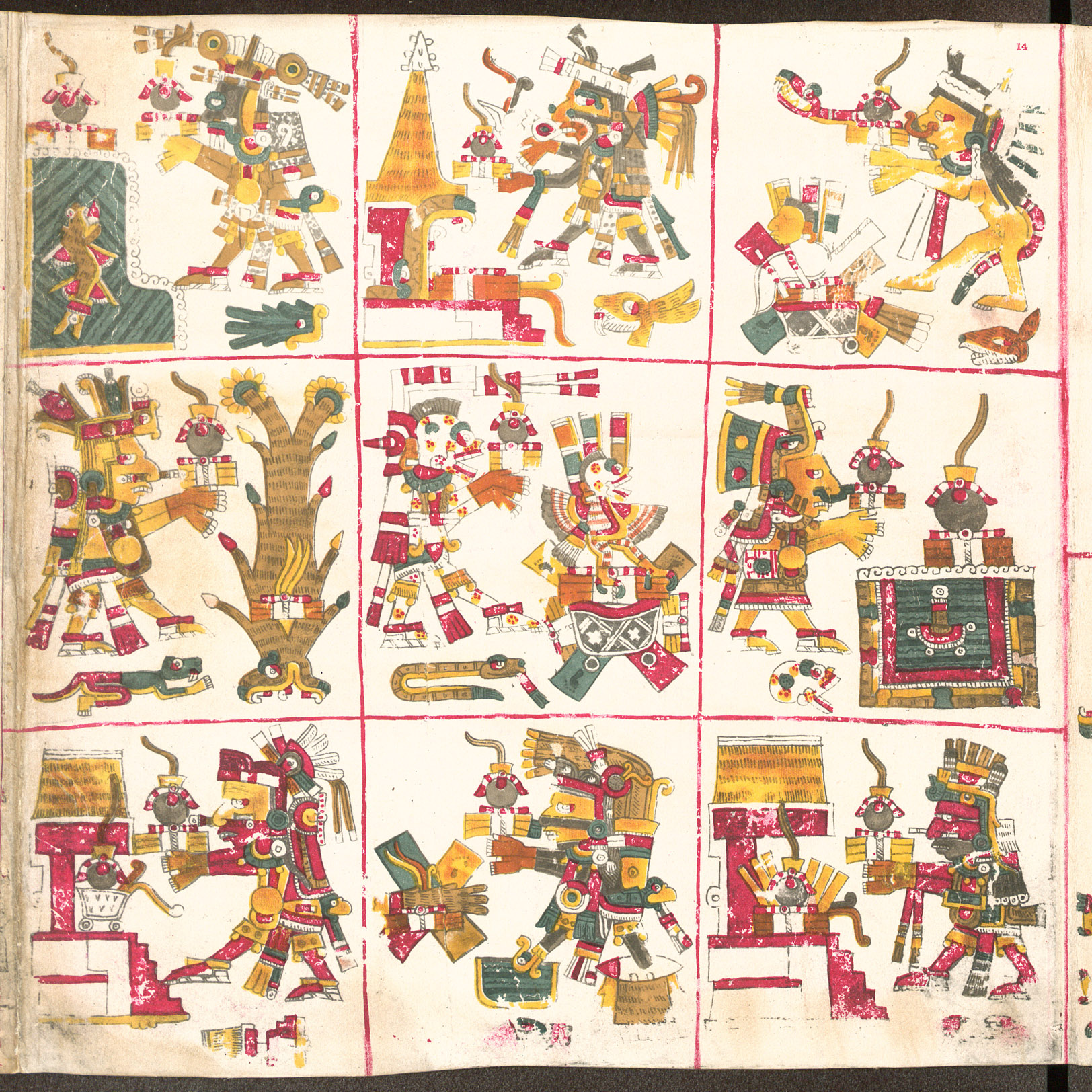

=== Section 4 and 5: Mantics referring to children. Tezcatlipoca, lord of fate (15–17) ===
Pages 15 to 17 depict deities associated with childbirth. Each of the twenty sections contains four day signs. The bottom section of page 17 contains a large depiction of Tezcatlipoca, with day signs associated with different parts of his body.

Images of pages 15–17

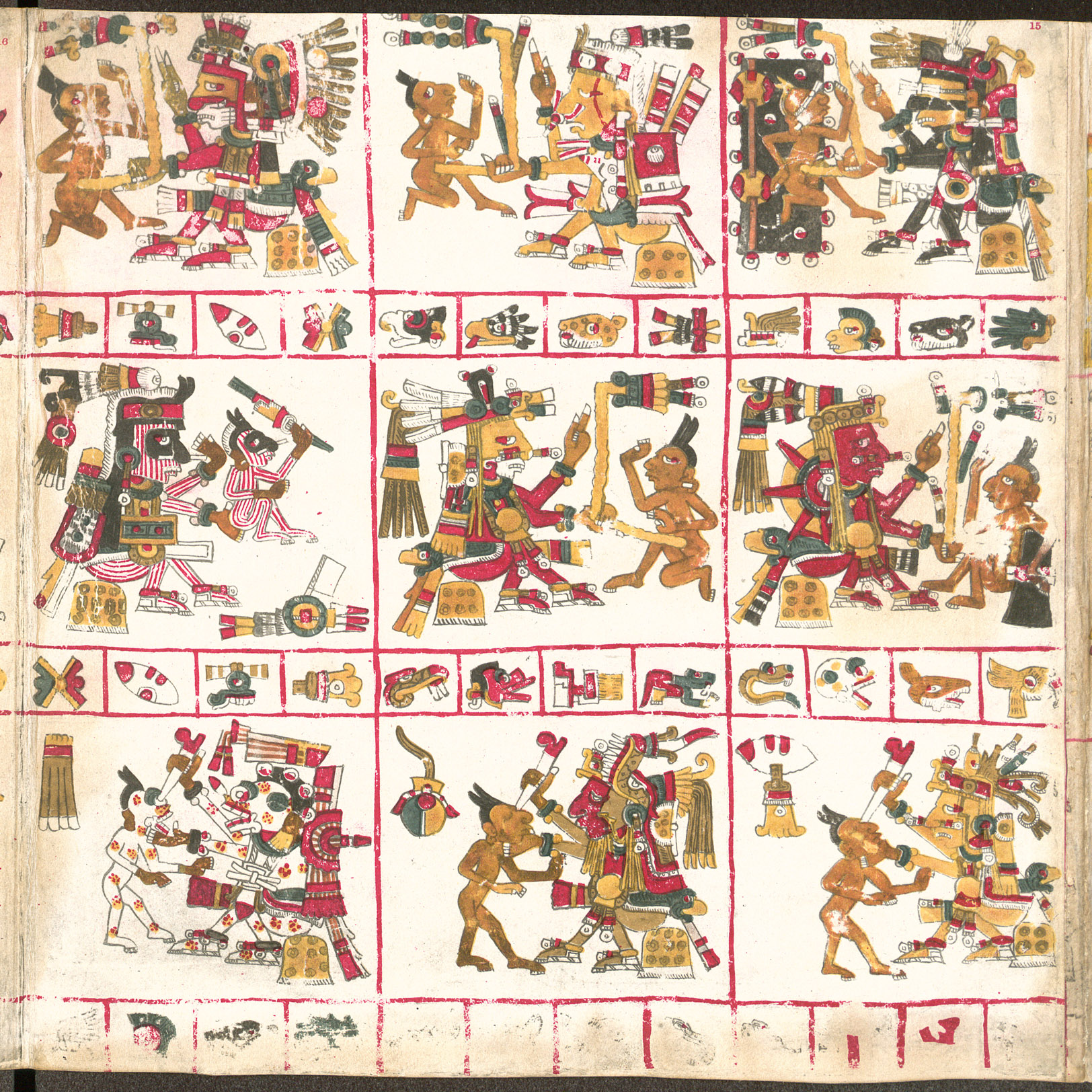
Page 15

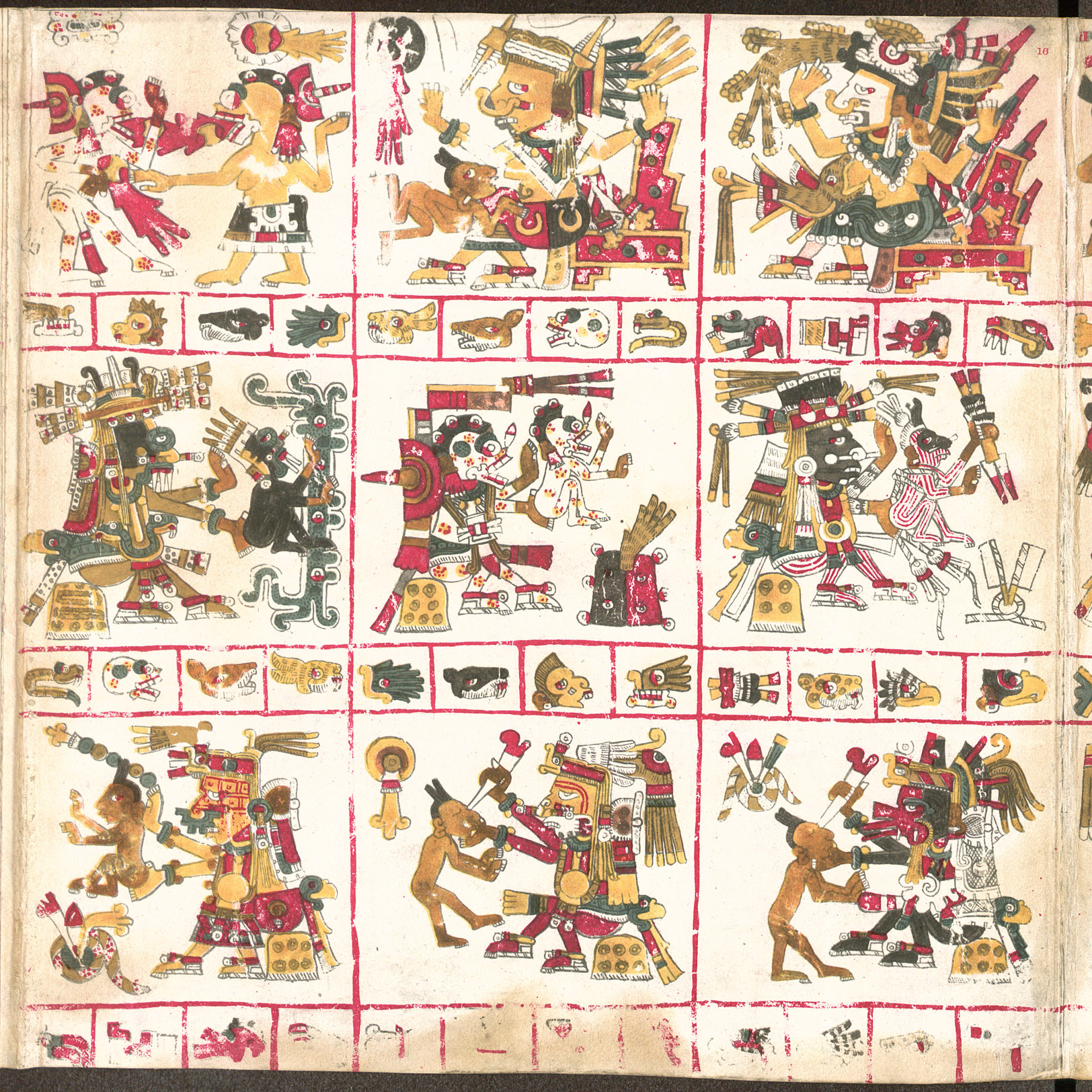
Page 16

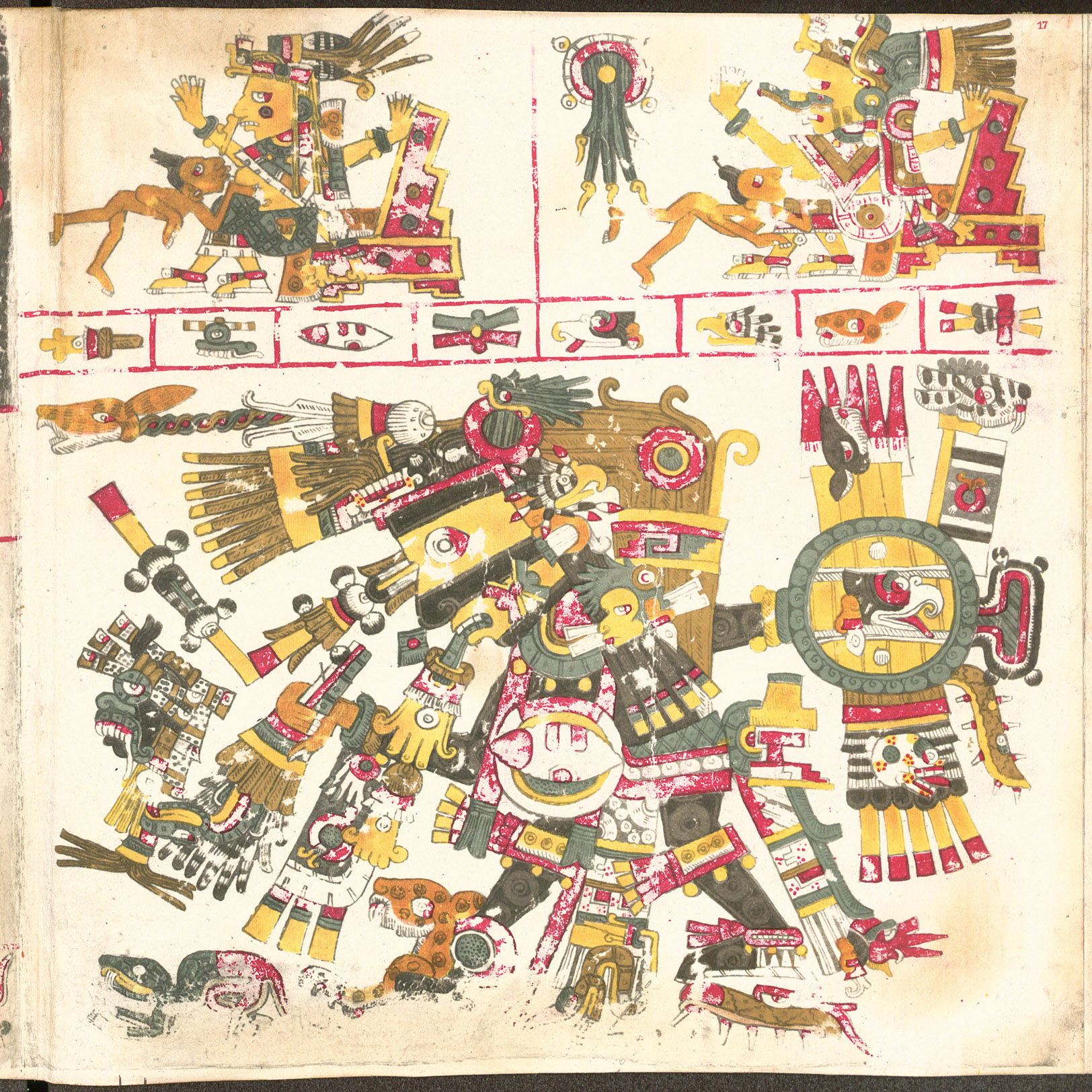
Page 17

=== Section 6: Different prognostications (18–21) ===
Prognostications related to different activities being performed by gods, including religious activities (Tonatiuh, Ehecatl), woodcutting (Tlahuizcalpantecuhtli), agriculture (Tlaloc), crossing a river (Chalchiuhtlicue) travelling (red Tezcatlipoca), and the ball-game (black Tezcatlipoca).

Images of pages 18–21

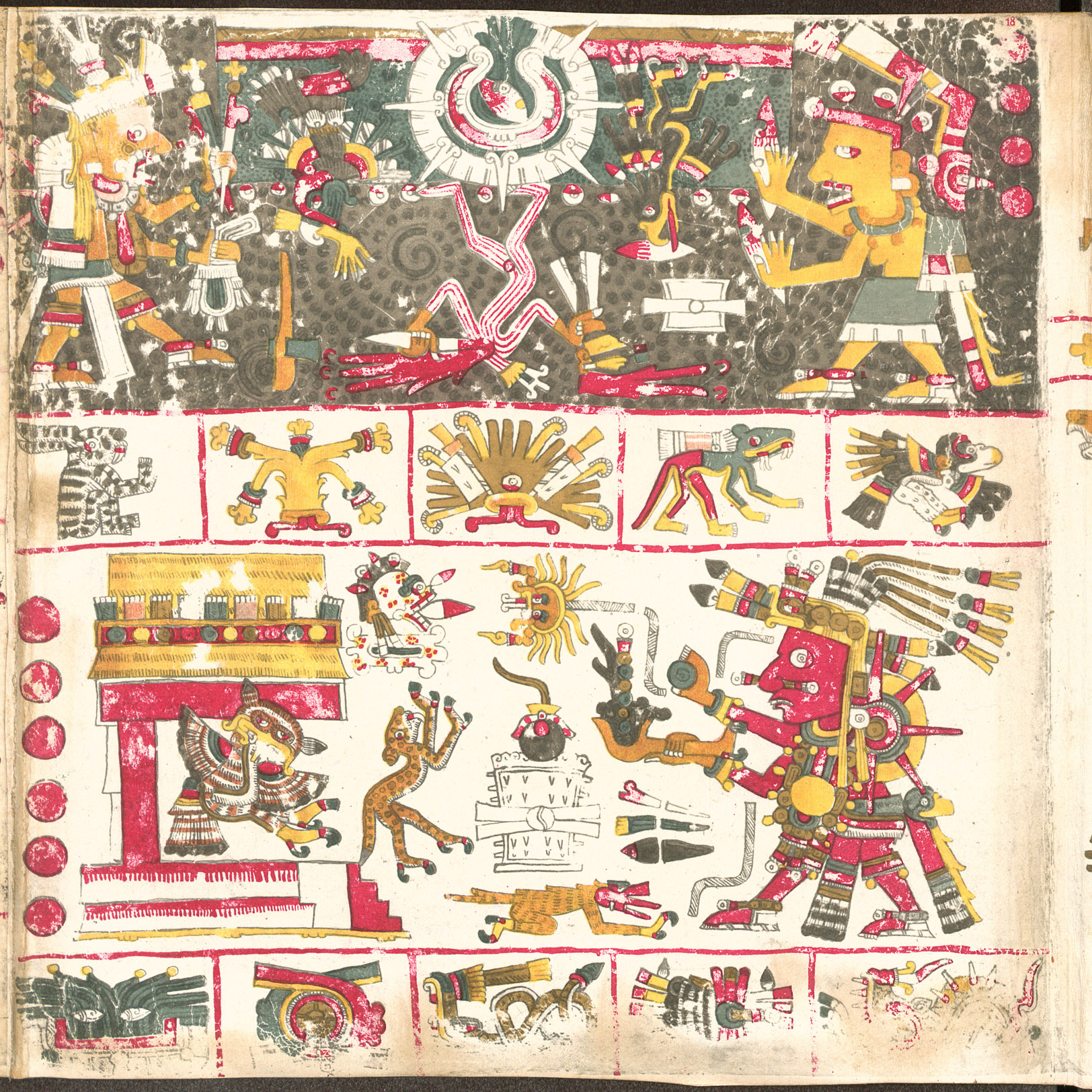
Page 18

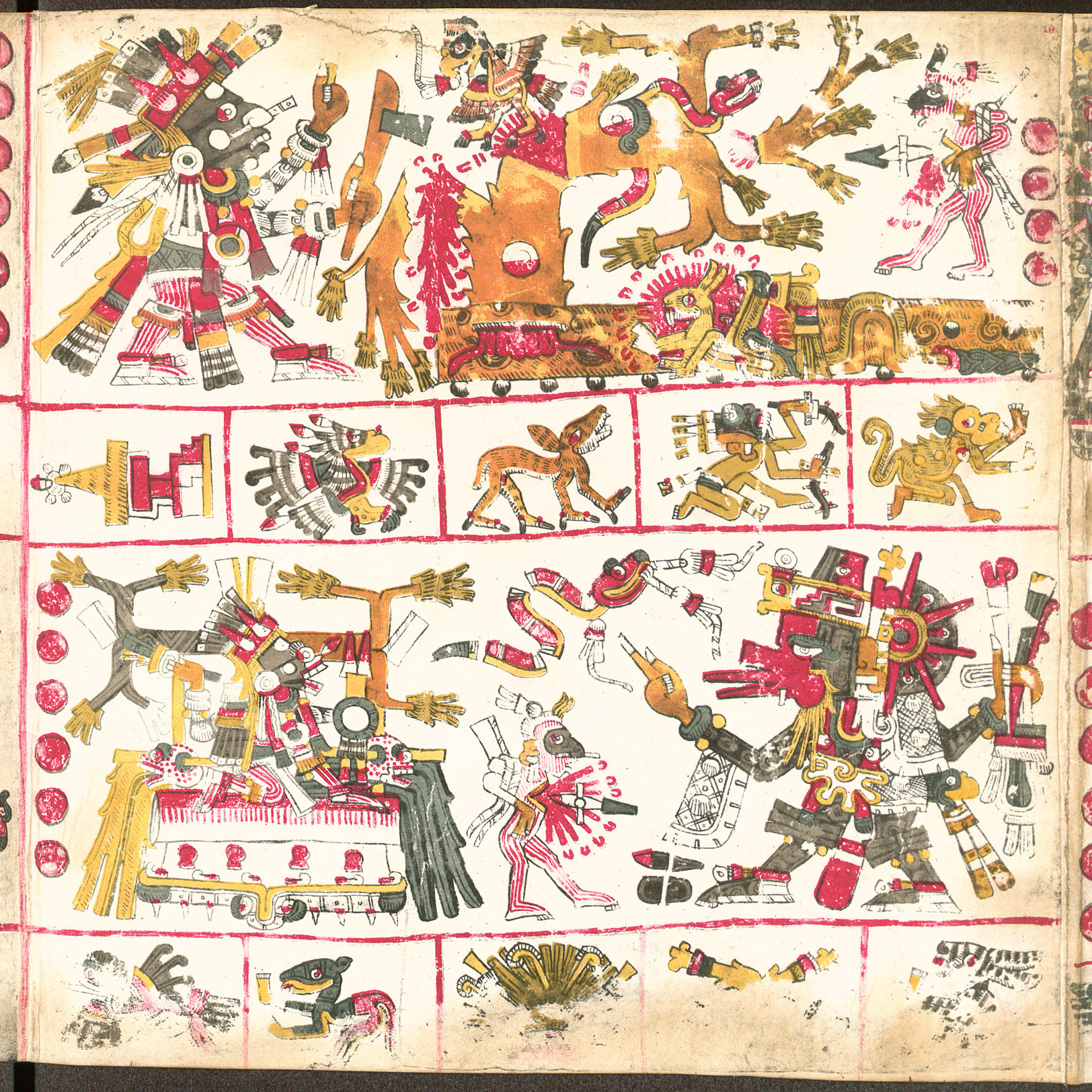
Page 19

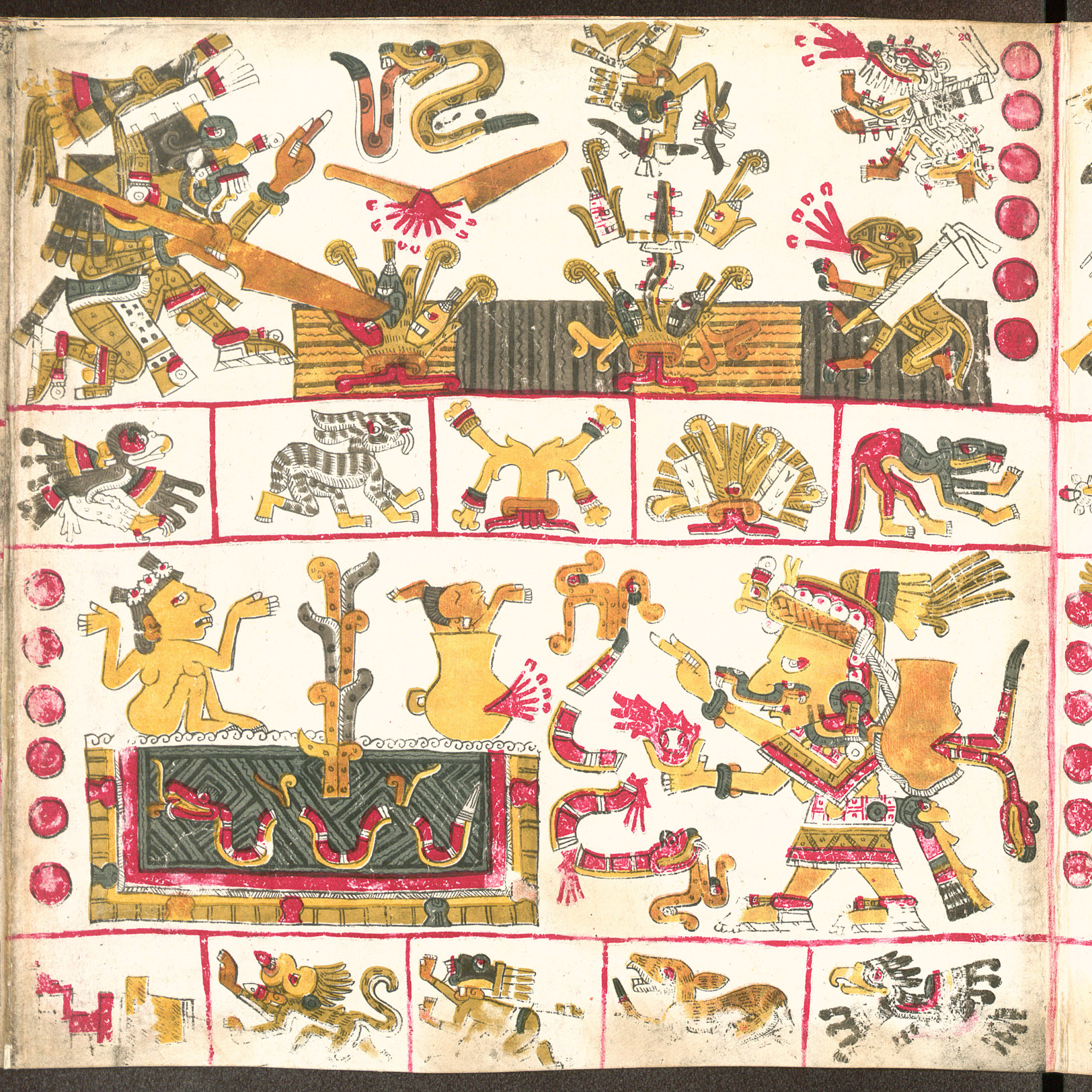
Page 20

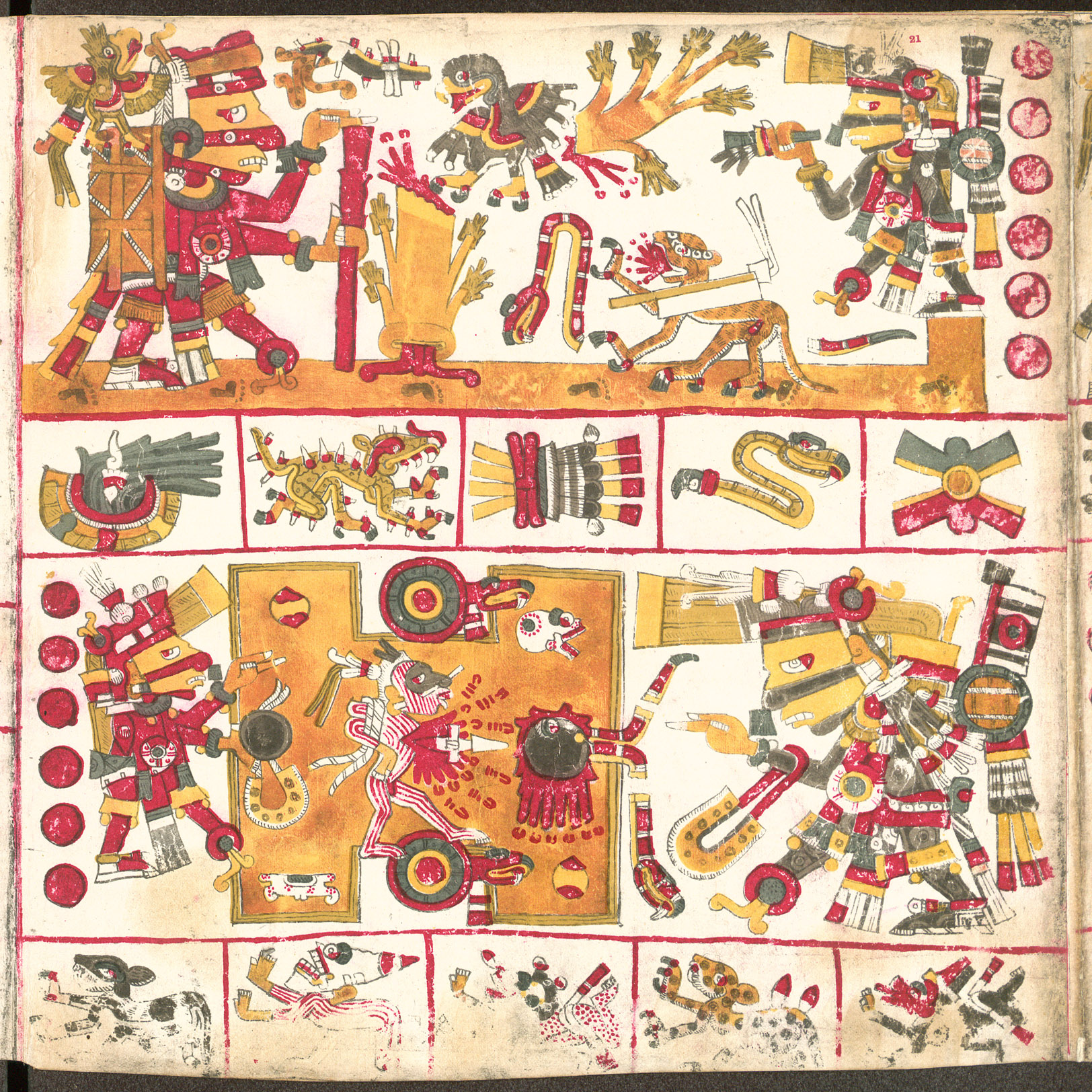
Page 21

=== Section 7 and 8: Wounded deer and the cultic qualities of the 20 day-signs (22–24) ===
The upper side of page 22 presents two deer, one white, with closed eyes and surrounded by precious regalia, and other being pierced by a dart or arrow, which gives its name to the section. Pages 22–24 present the ritual qualities of the 20 day-signs.

Images of pages 22–24

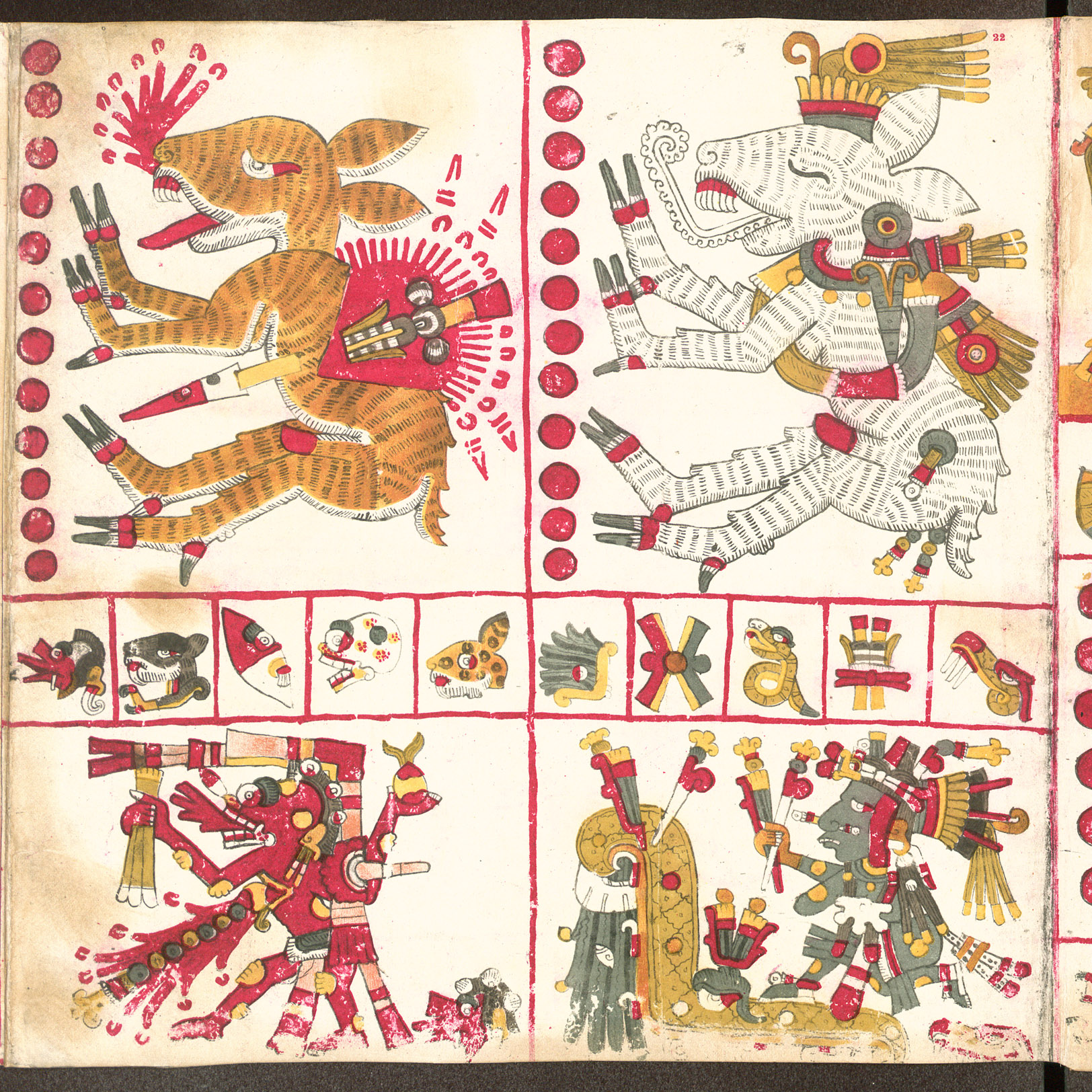
Page 22

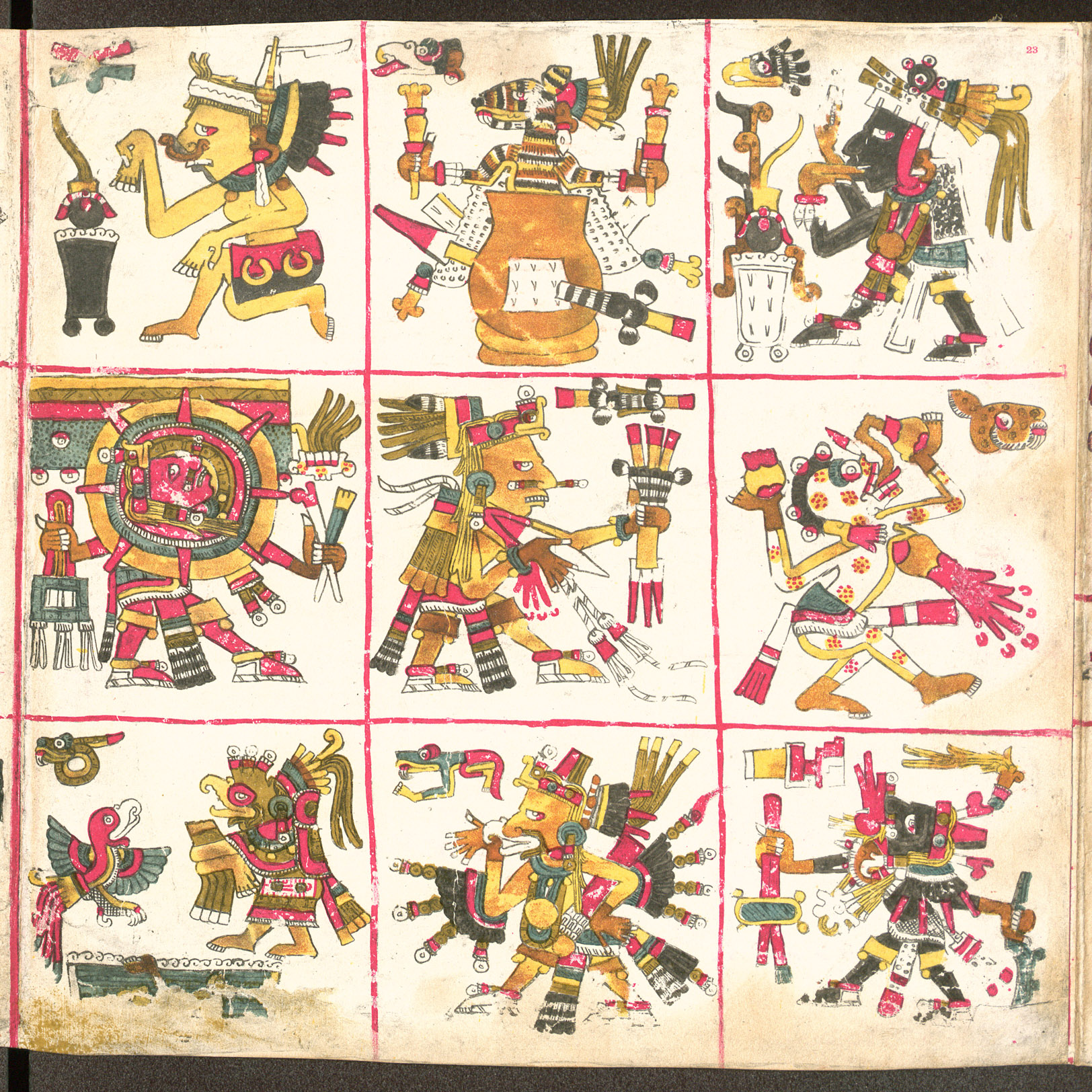
Page 23

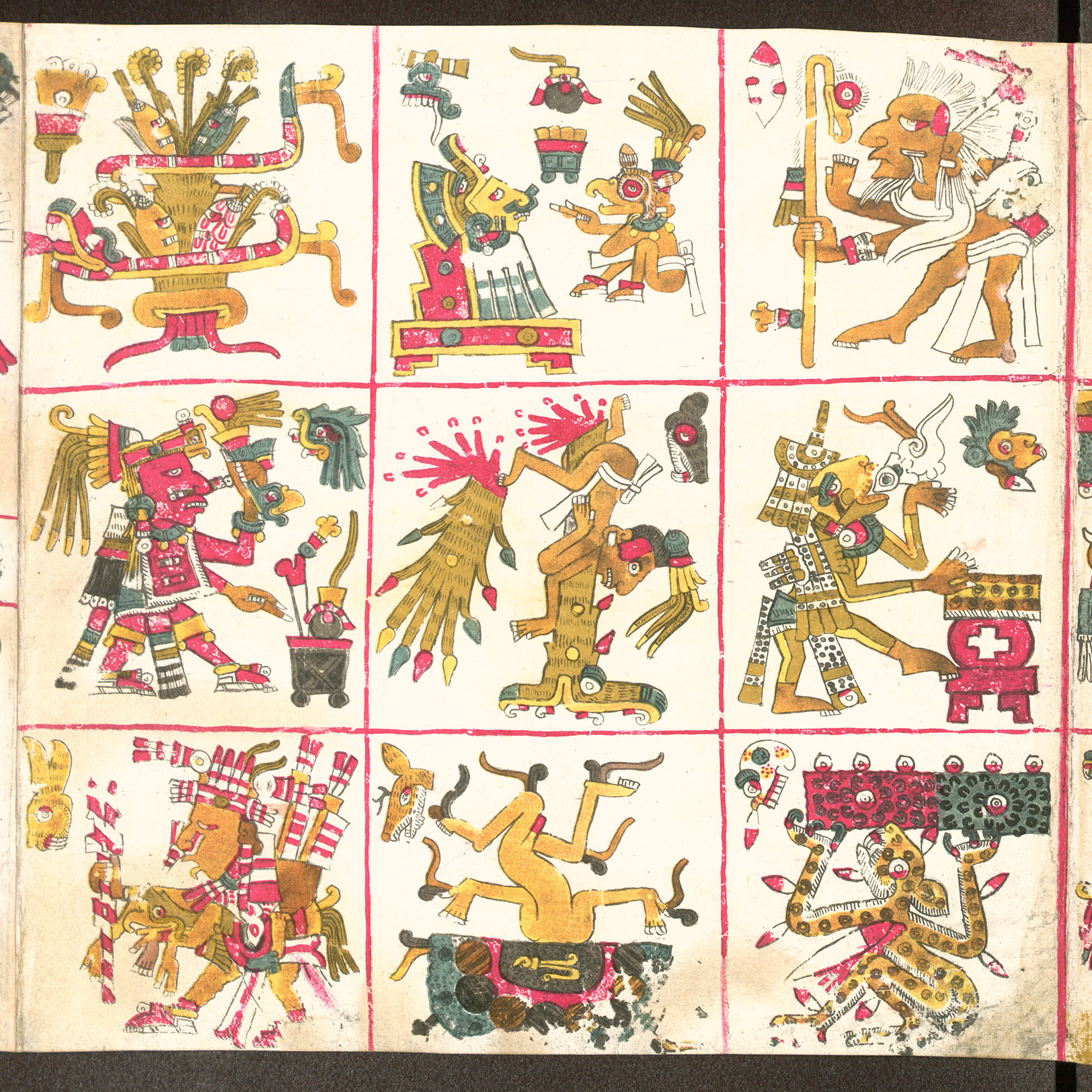
Page 24

=== Section 9 and 10: The four quarters and the region of the dead ===
Two directional almanacs, one depicting four deities (Tlaloc, Xipe Totec, an unidentified Mixtec god, and Mixcoatl), and a directional almanac related to death, associated with four deities.

Images of pages 25-26

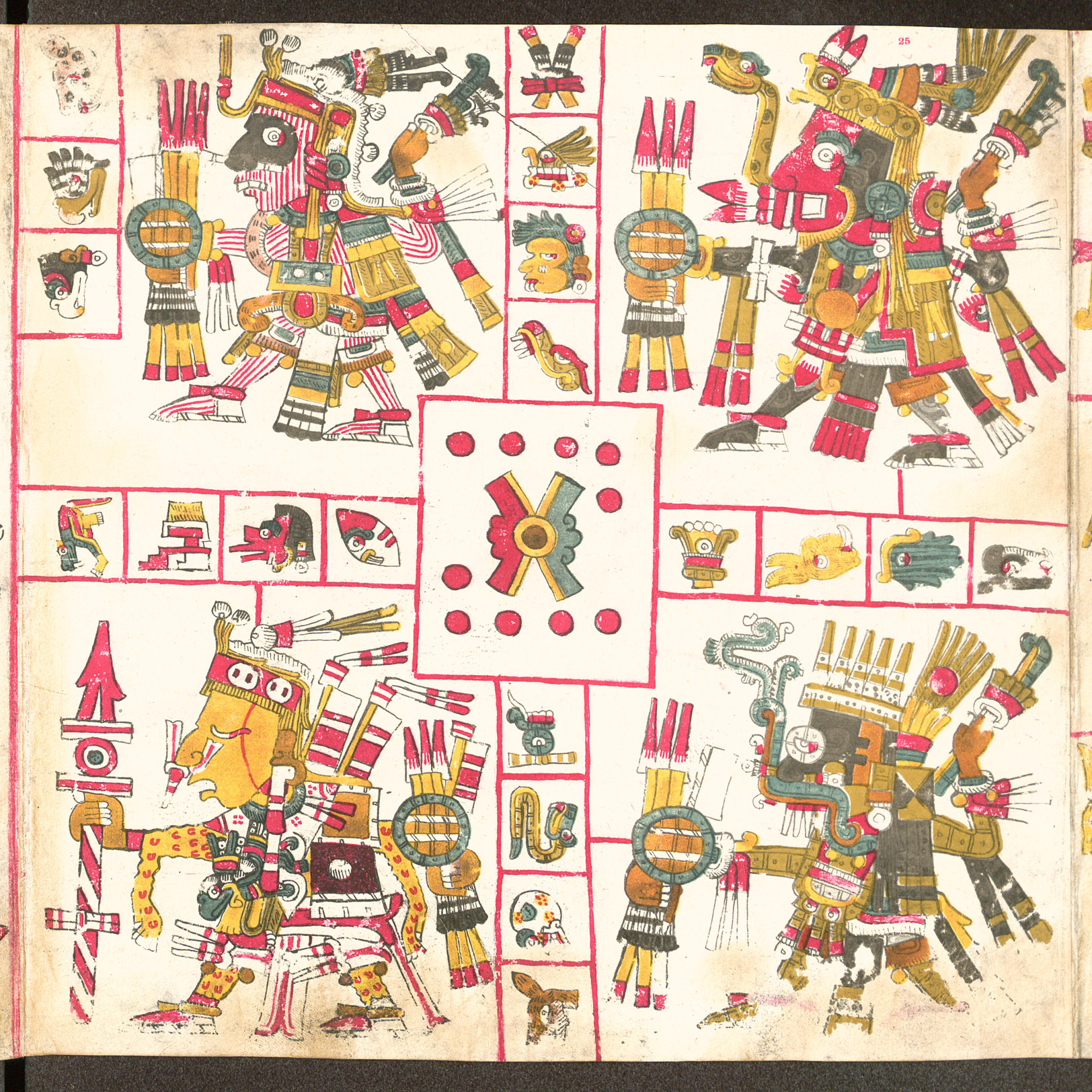
Page 25

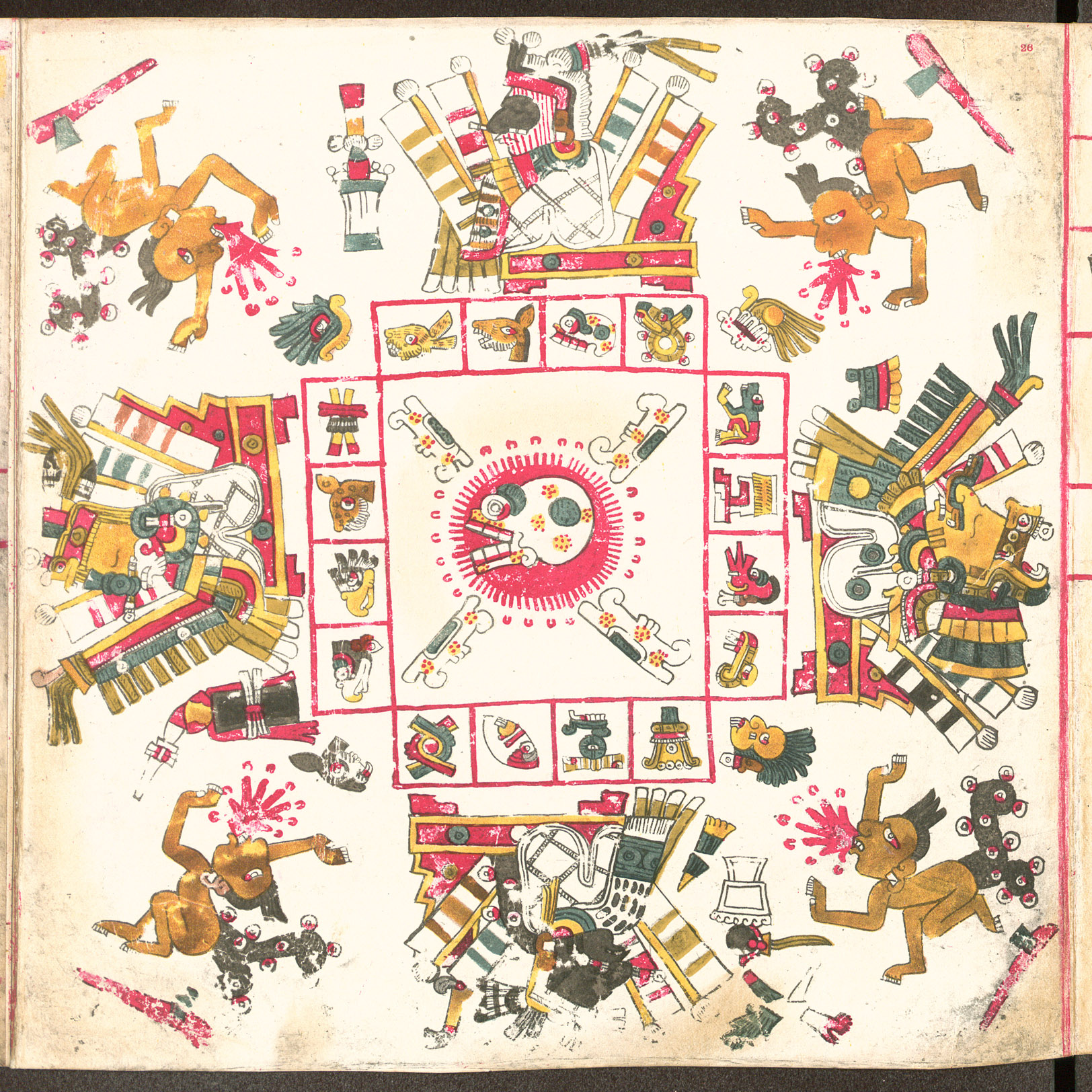
Page 26

=== Section 11 and 12: The rain gods of the 4 quarters and the centre (27–28) ===
Pages 27 and 28 center on the Postclassical period central Mexican rain god Tlaloc, associated to the 4 quarters and the centre, as well as the qualities of the rains that he will bring, some destructive, some beneficial.

Images of pages 27-28

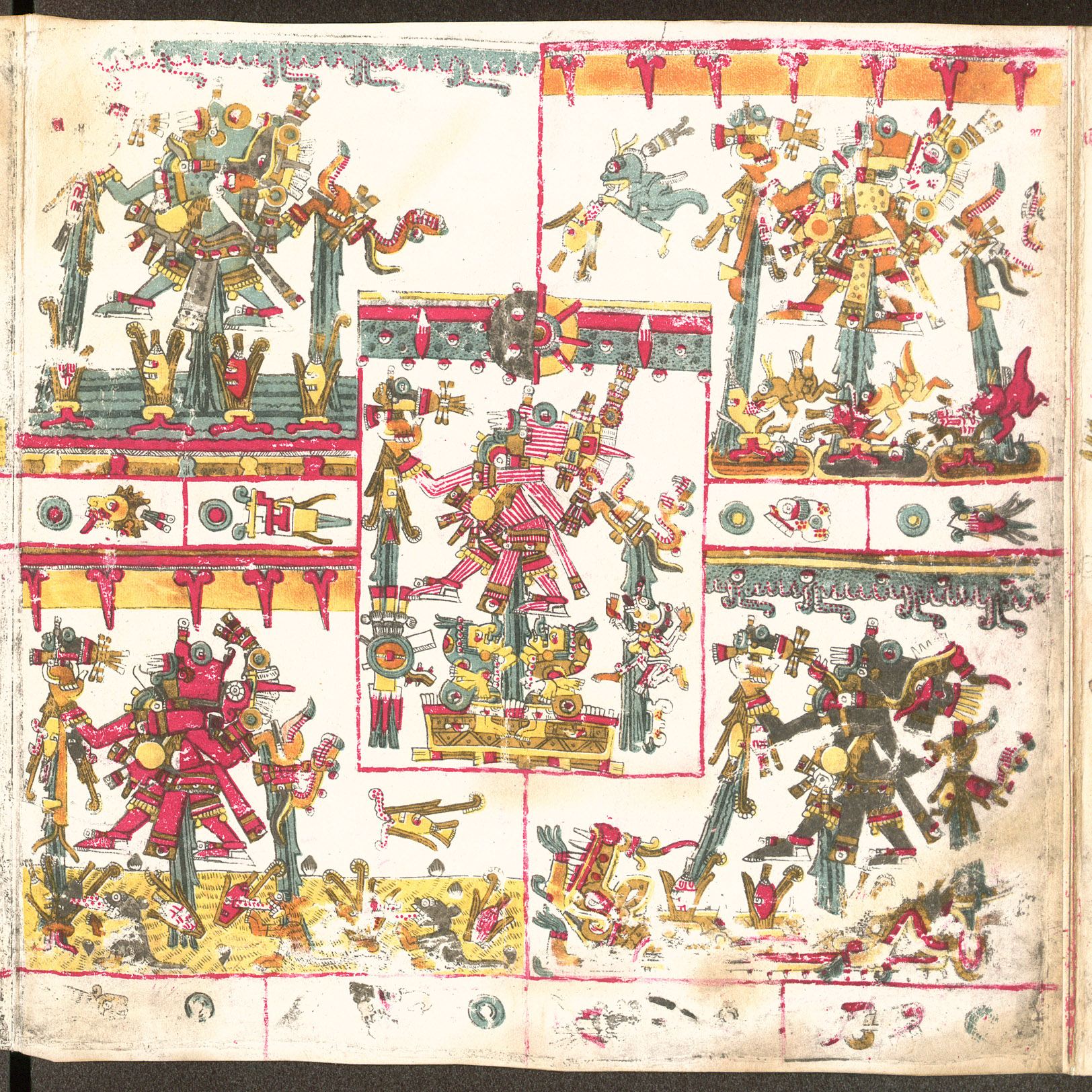
Page 27

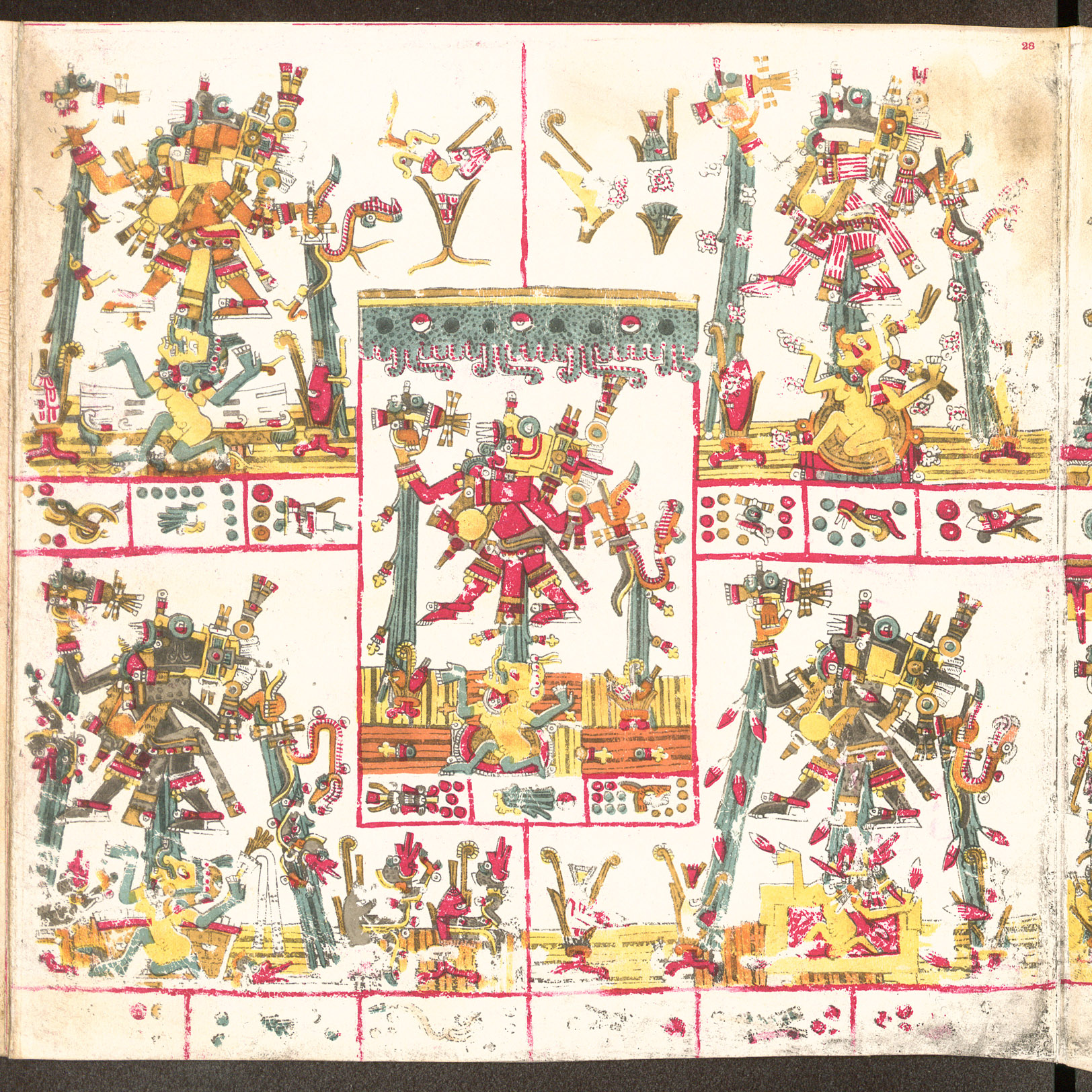
Page 28

=== Section 13 (pages 29–46): The Cultic Part ===
Having no discernible parallels with other manuscripts within the Borgia Group, the interpretation of this section has varied strongly throughout the years. Its first interpreter, the jesuit Lino Fábrega, considered it to be a native Zodiac, divided in 18 signs. Eduard Seler, its first modern interpreter, considered it to be the journey of Venus through the underworld. His astronomical interpretation was continued by his disciple, Friedrich Röck, as well as modern scholars such as Susan Milbrath. It was Karl Anton Nowotny, a disciple of Röck, who first questioned the 'astral interpretation' of Seler's school, partly inspired by Alfonso Caso's work on Mixtec codices, where it was demonstrated that those documents were not astronomical, but historical. Nowotny proposed that each of the 18 pages of this section describes a different ritual, proposing the following internal division:

1. Cult of the wind gods (p. 29)
2. Cult of the rain gods (p. 30)
3. Cult of the maguey (p. 31, above)
4. Cult of the corn (p. 31, below)
5. Cult of Tezcatlipoca (p. 32)
6. The black temple (p. 33)
7. The red temple (p. 34)
8. Opening of a ritual bundle (p. 33)
9. Sacrifice to the sun (p. 39-40)
10. Sacrifice to the Cihuapipiltin (pp. 41–42)
11. A corn festival (p. 43)
12. Enthronement of a prince (p. 44)
13. Cult of the Morning Star (p. 45)
14. Fire-Drilling (p. 46)

Nowotny's interpretation has become the basis of many subsequent readings, such as those of Ferdinand Anders, Maarten Jansen, and Luis Reyes (1993), who complemented Nowotny's interpretation with ethnographic data and re-interpreted some of the rituals; that of Bruce Byland and John Pohl, who researched the relationship between the rites depicted in this section and the rituals of Mixtec kings; and that of Samantha Gerritse, who offers a narratological analysis. Other diverging models are that offered by Elizabeth Hill Boone, who considers these pages to be a cosmological narrative, and that of Juan José Batalla Rosado, who considers them to be a series of hallucinations that pre-Hispanic priests would have to endure during initiation.

Images of pages 29–46

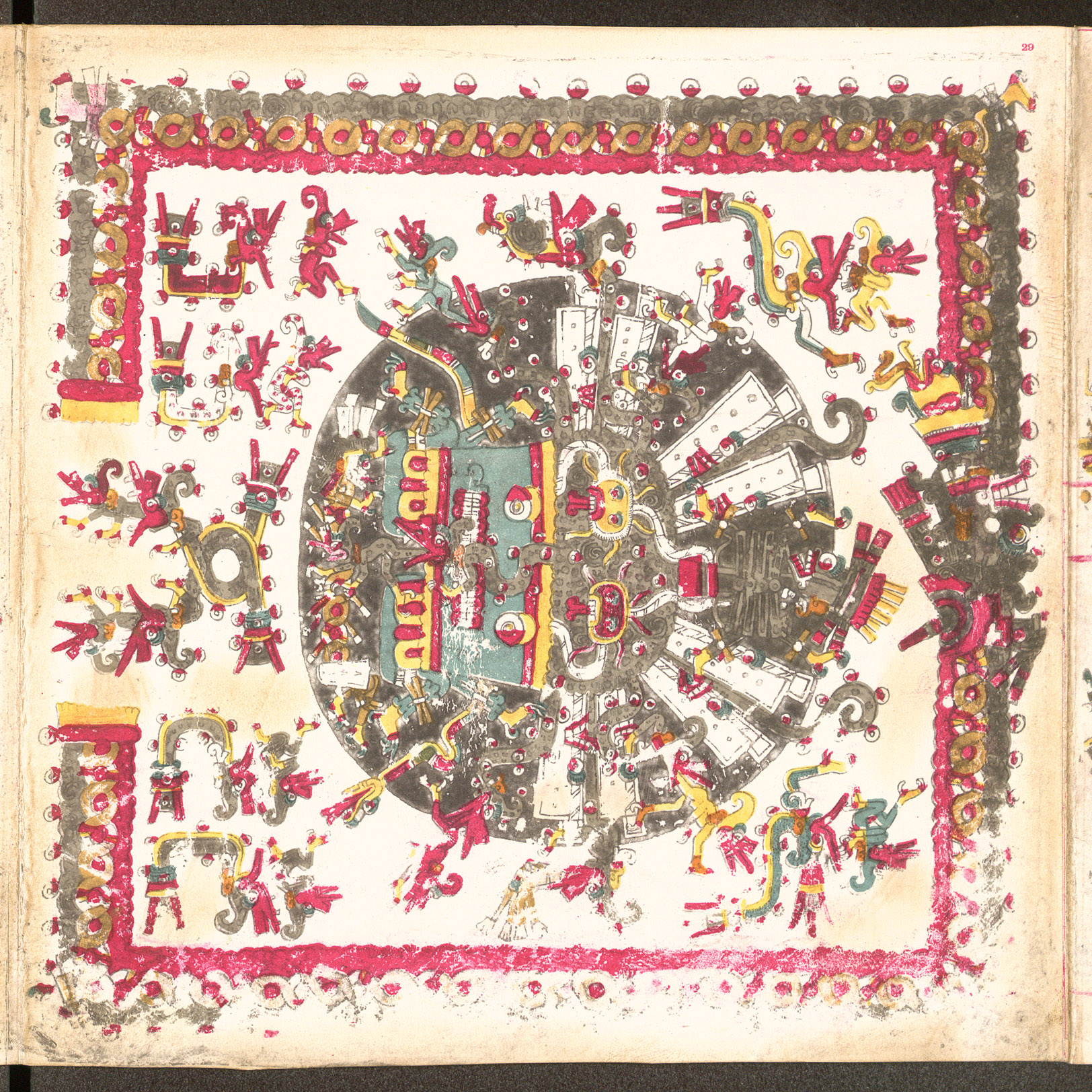
Page 29

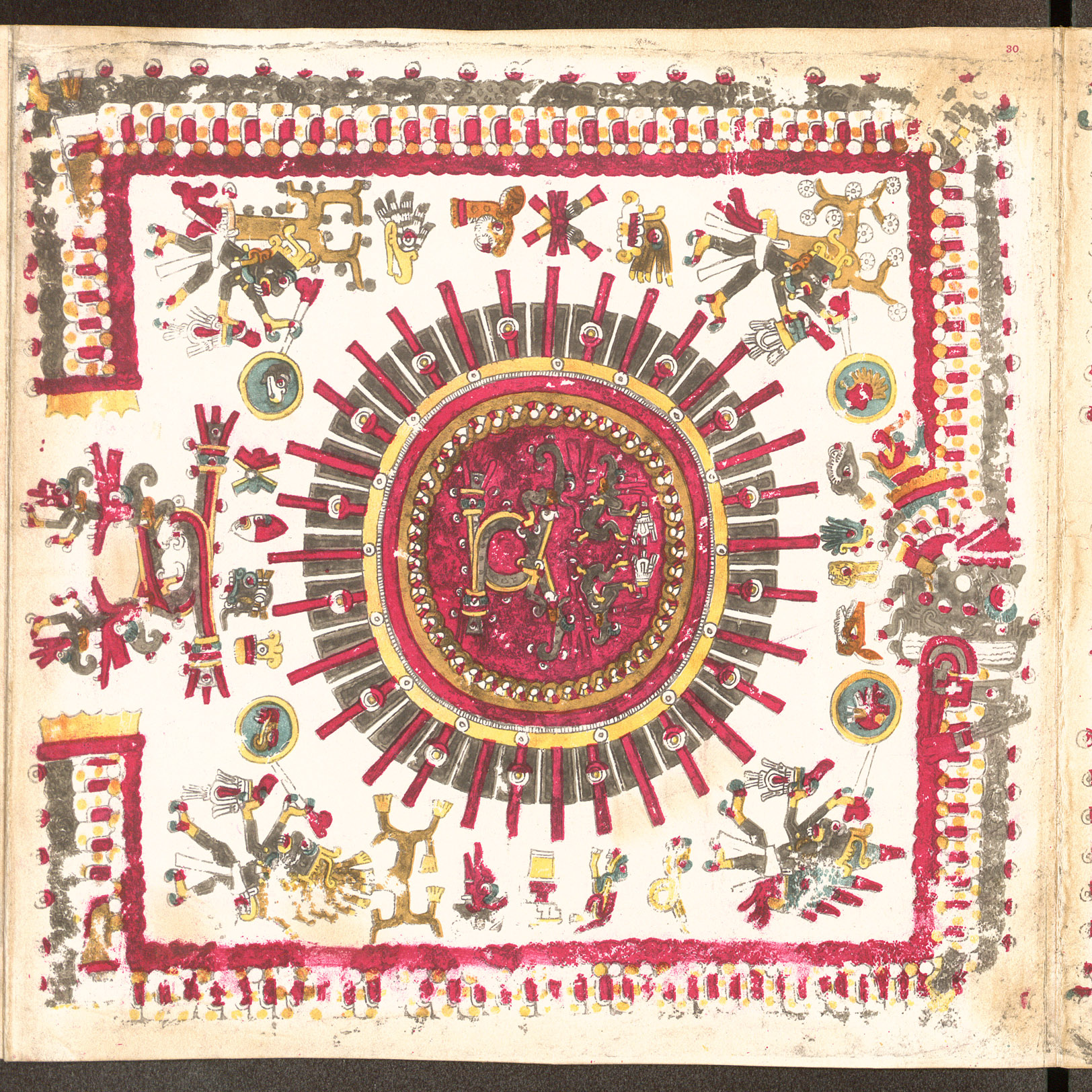
Page 30

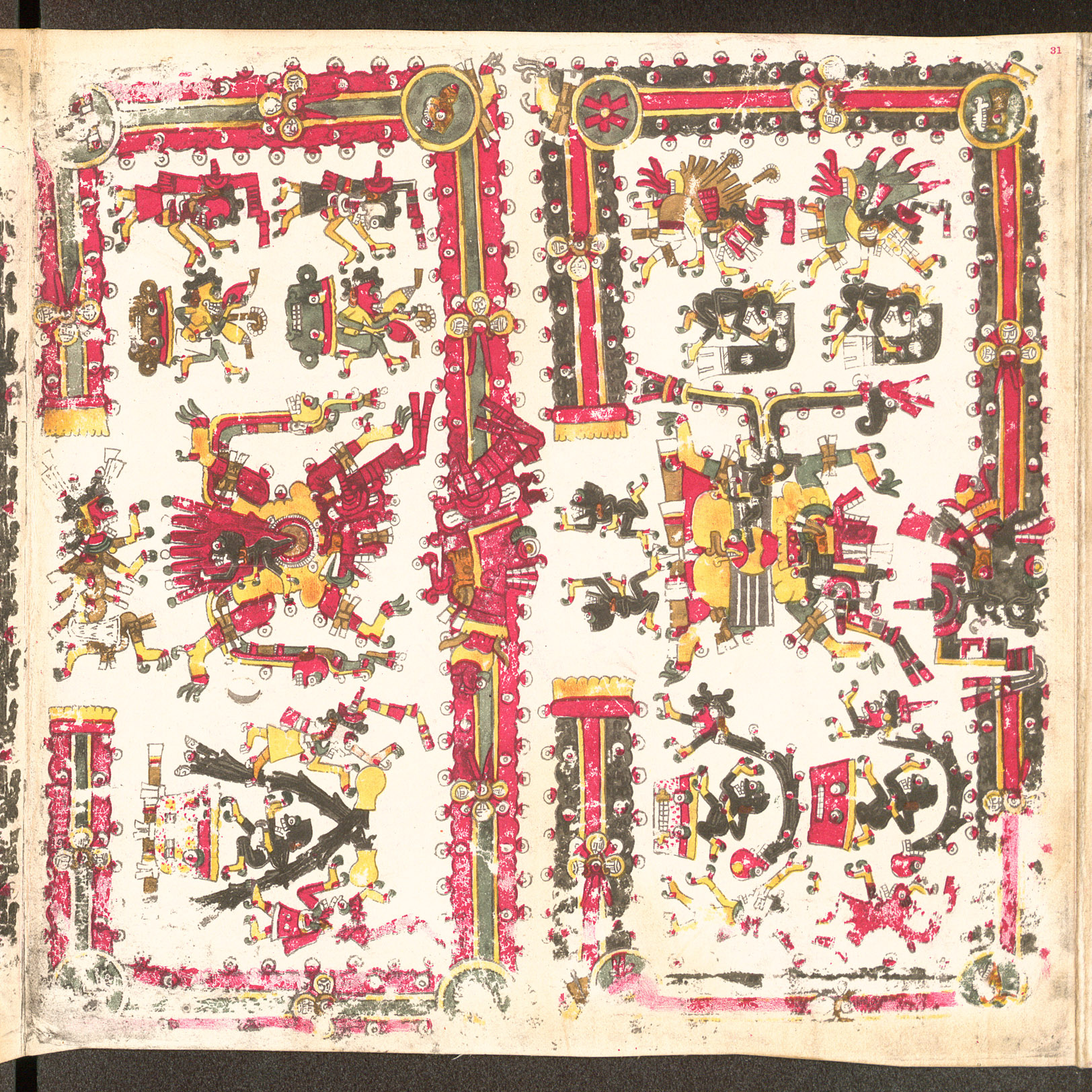
Page 31

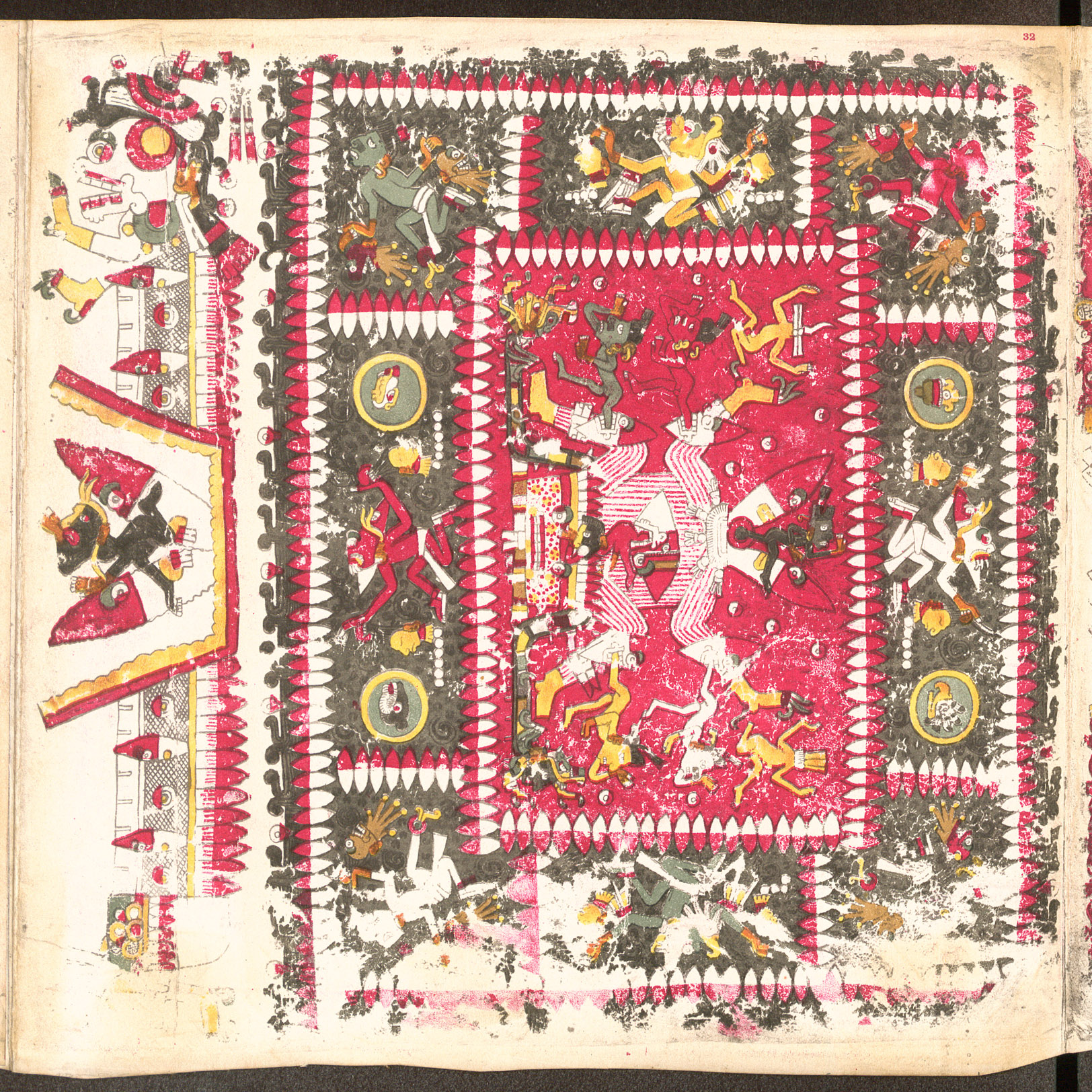
Page 32

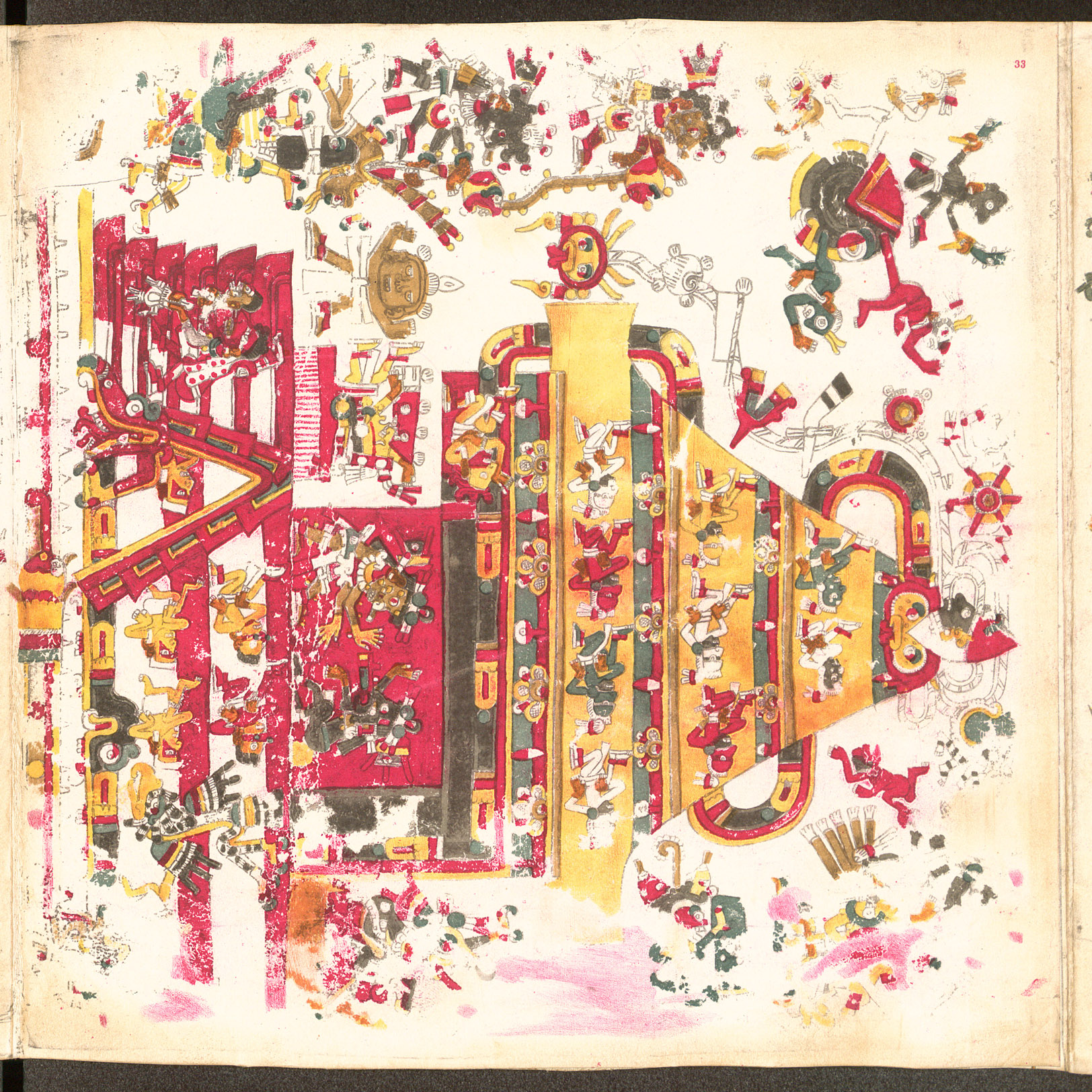
Page 33

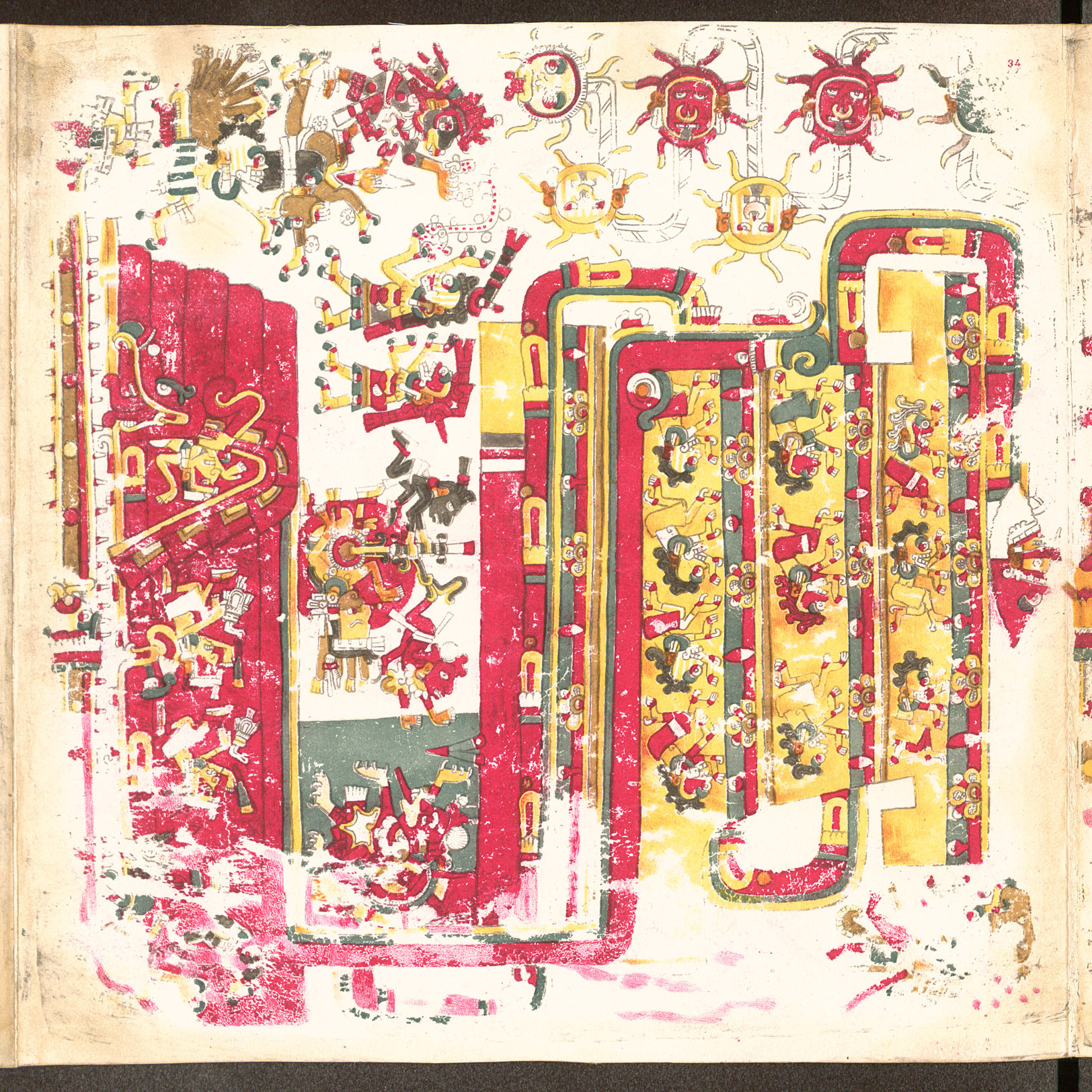
Page 34

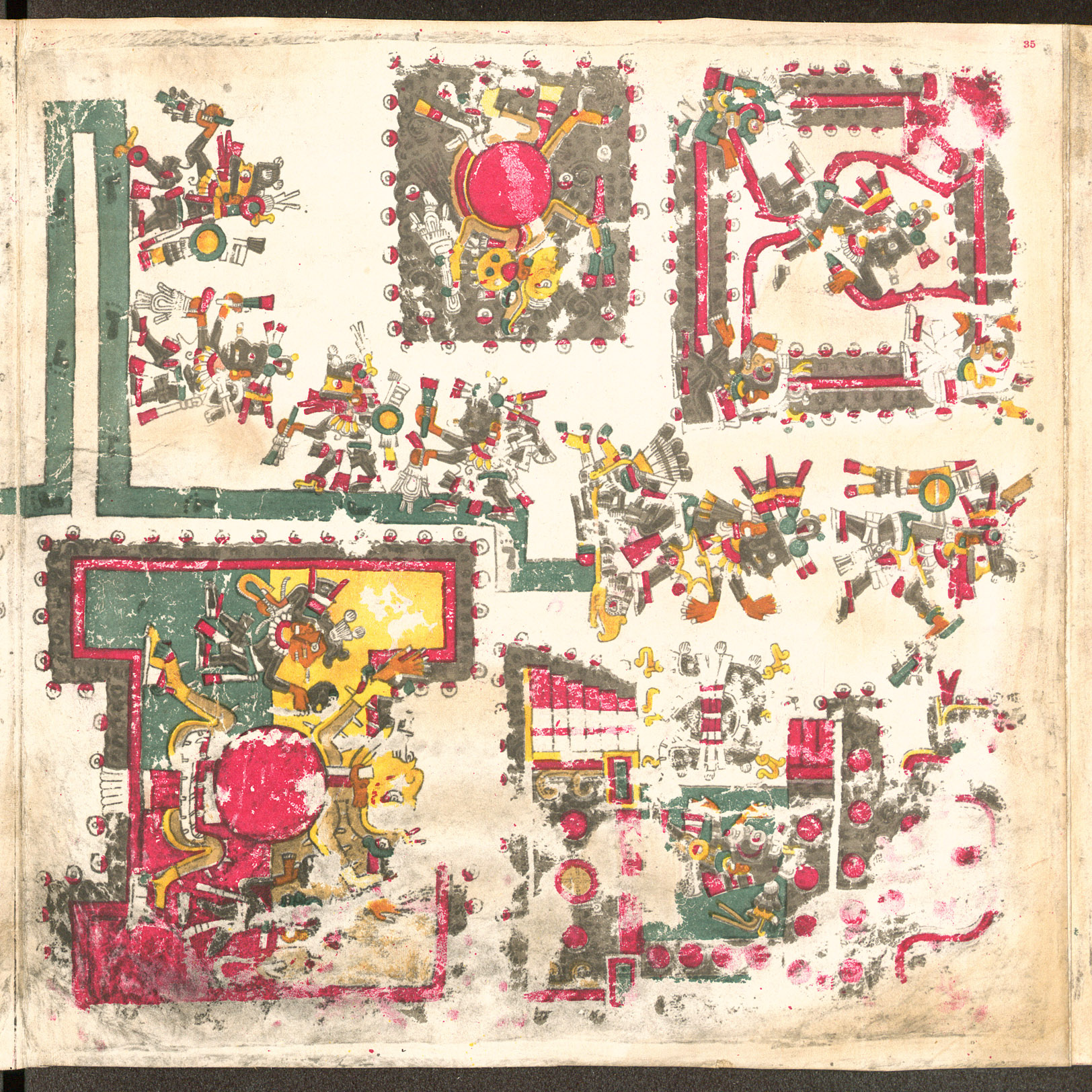
Page 35

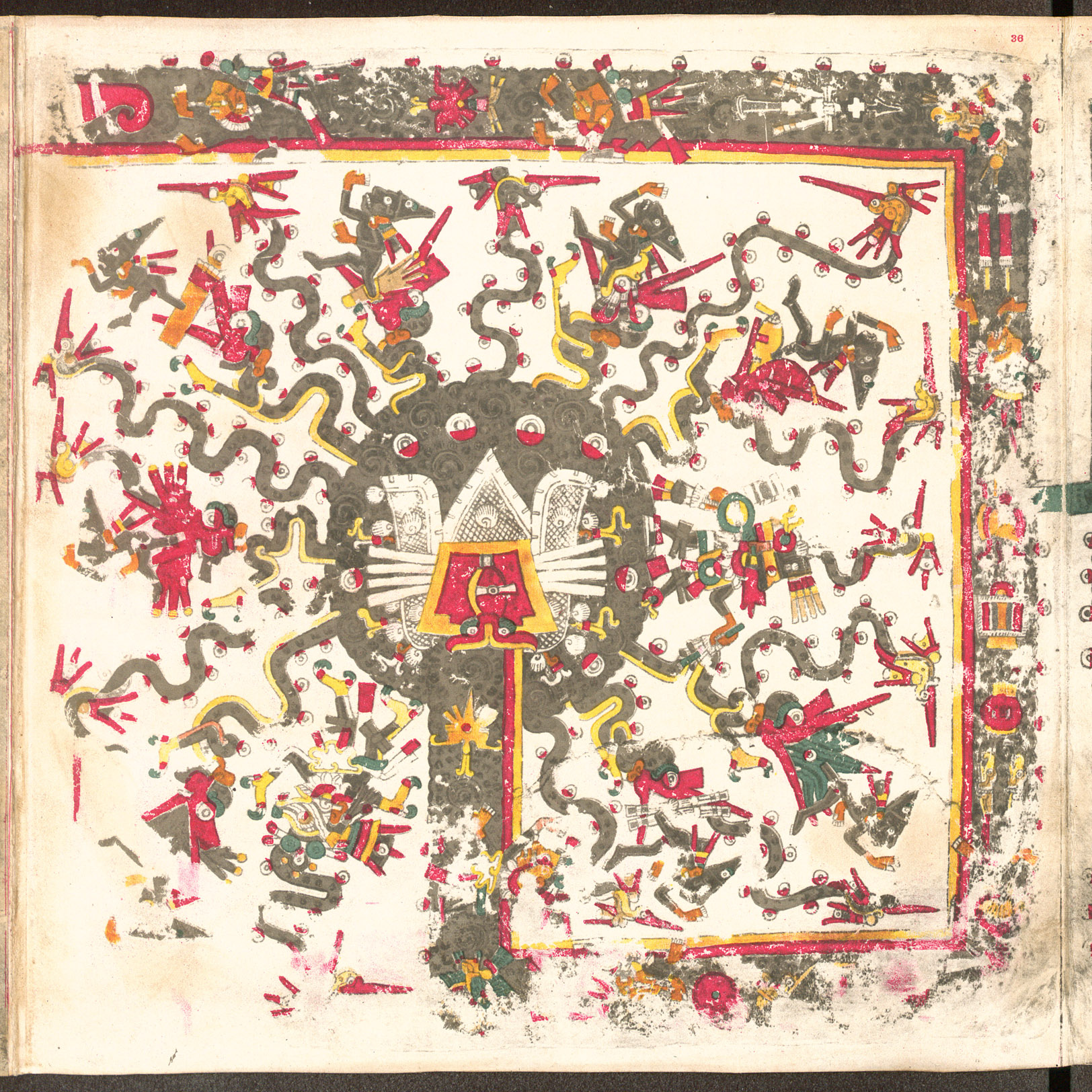
Page 36

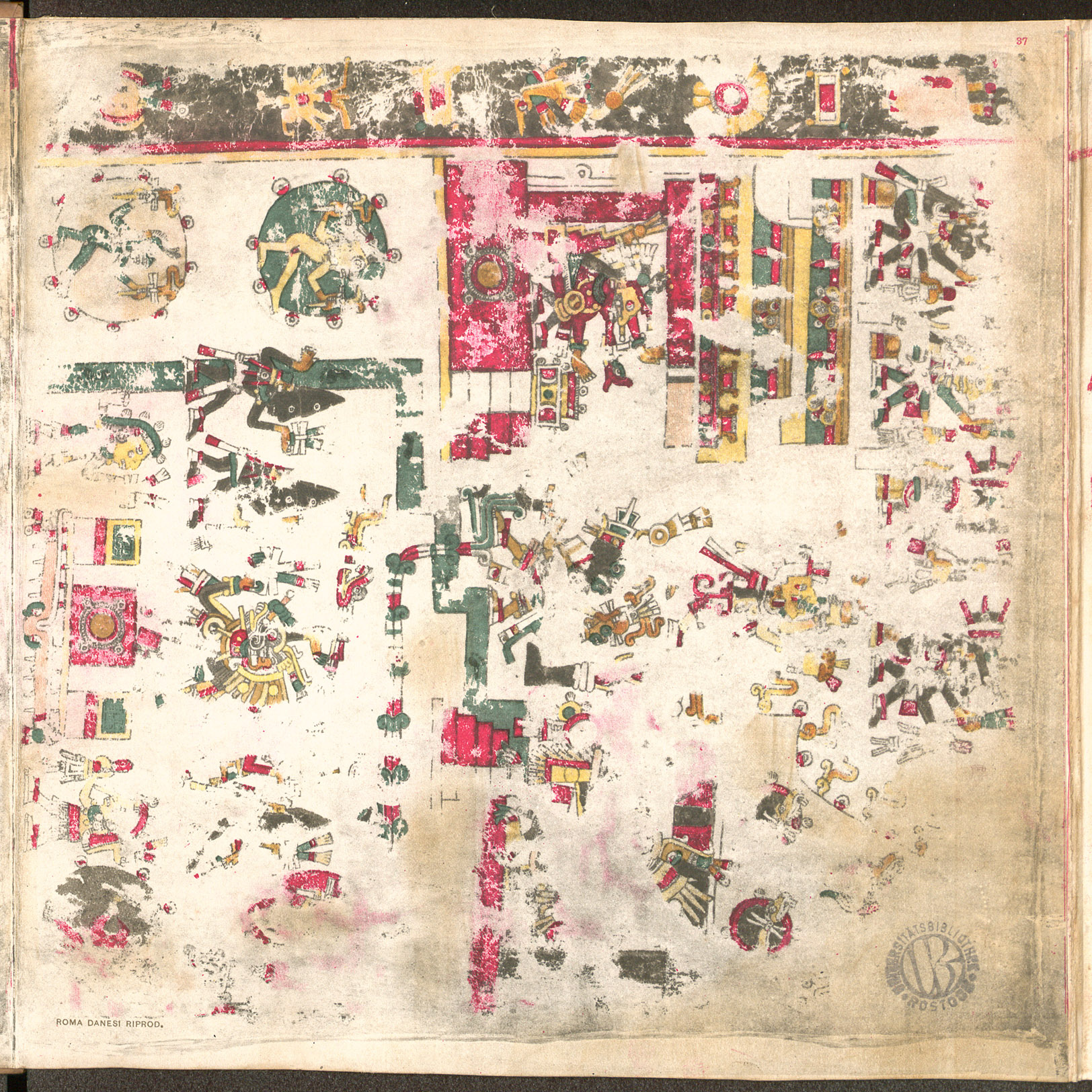
Page 37

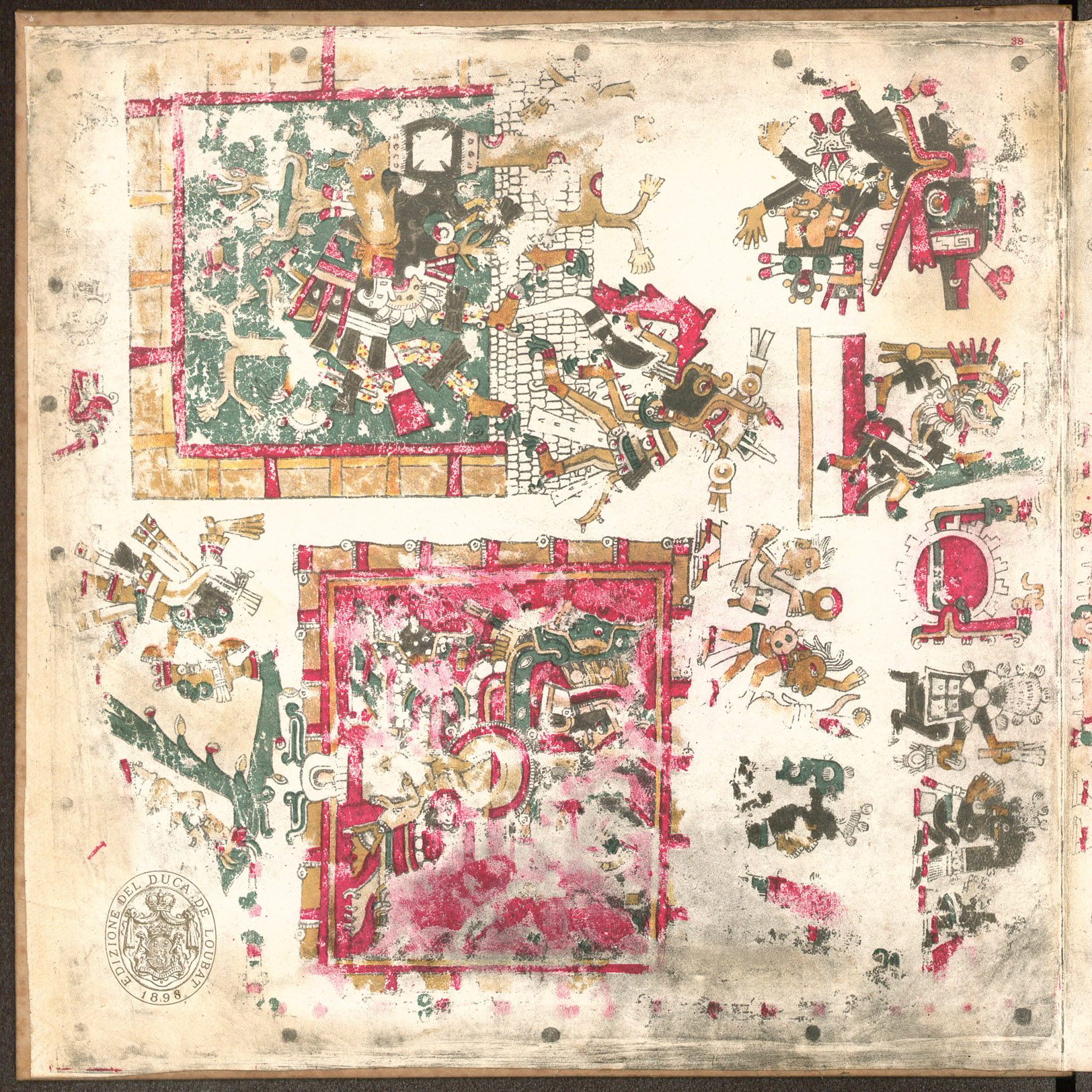
Page 38

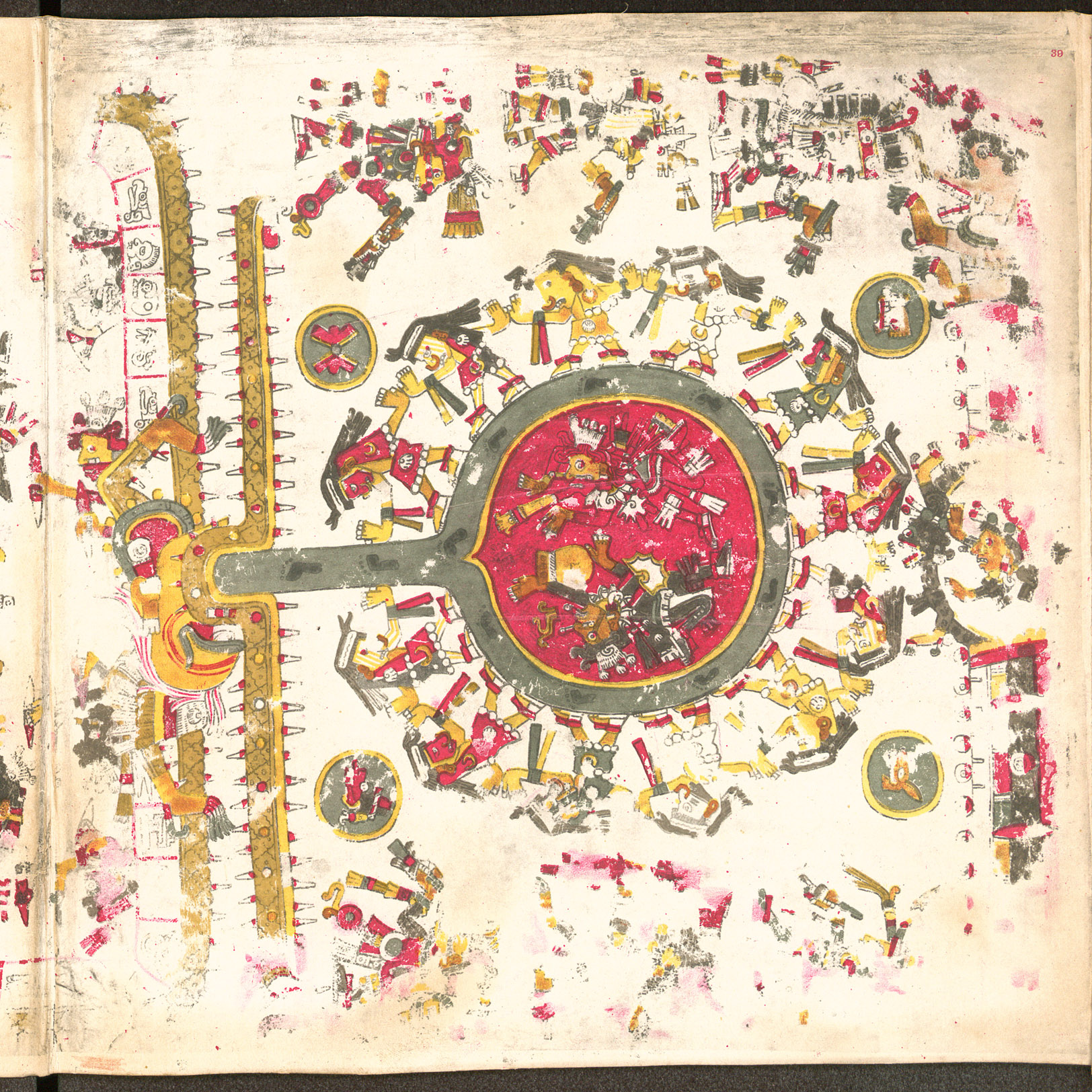
Page 39

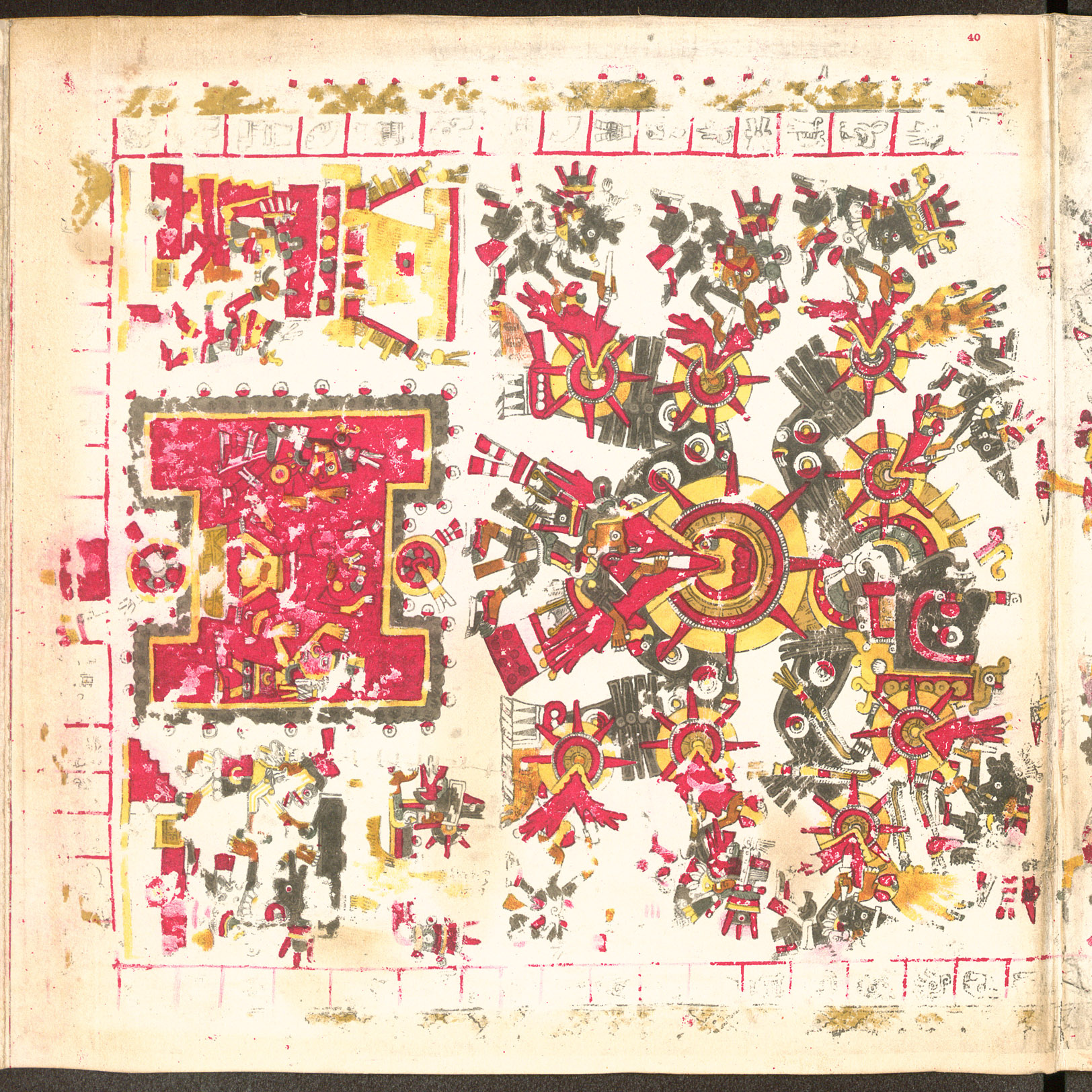
Page 40

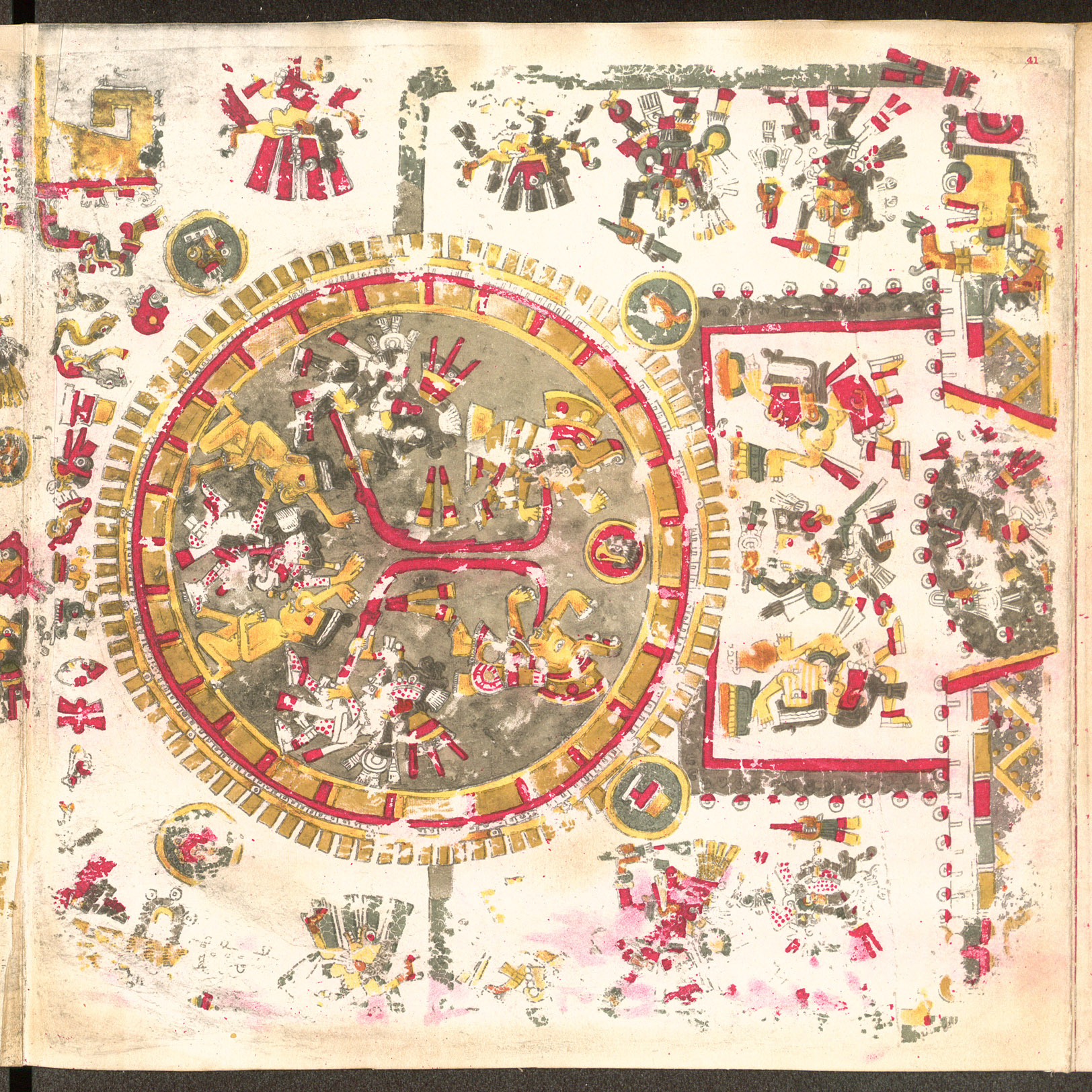
Page 41

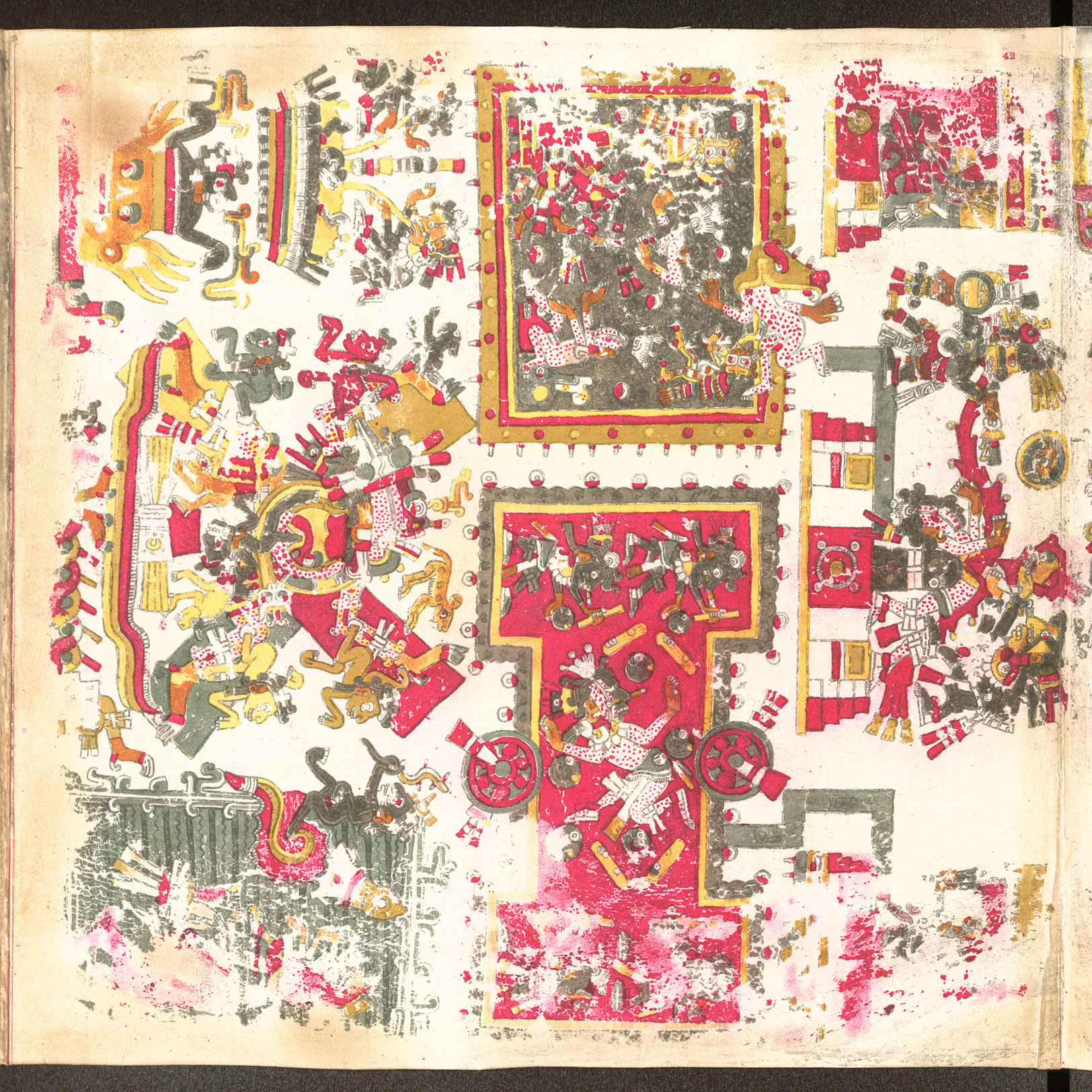
Page 42

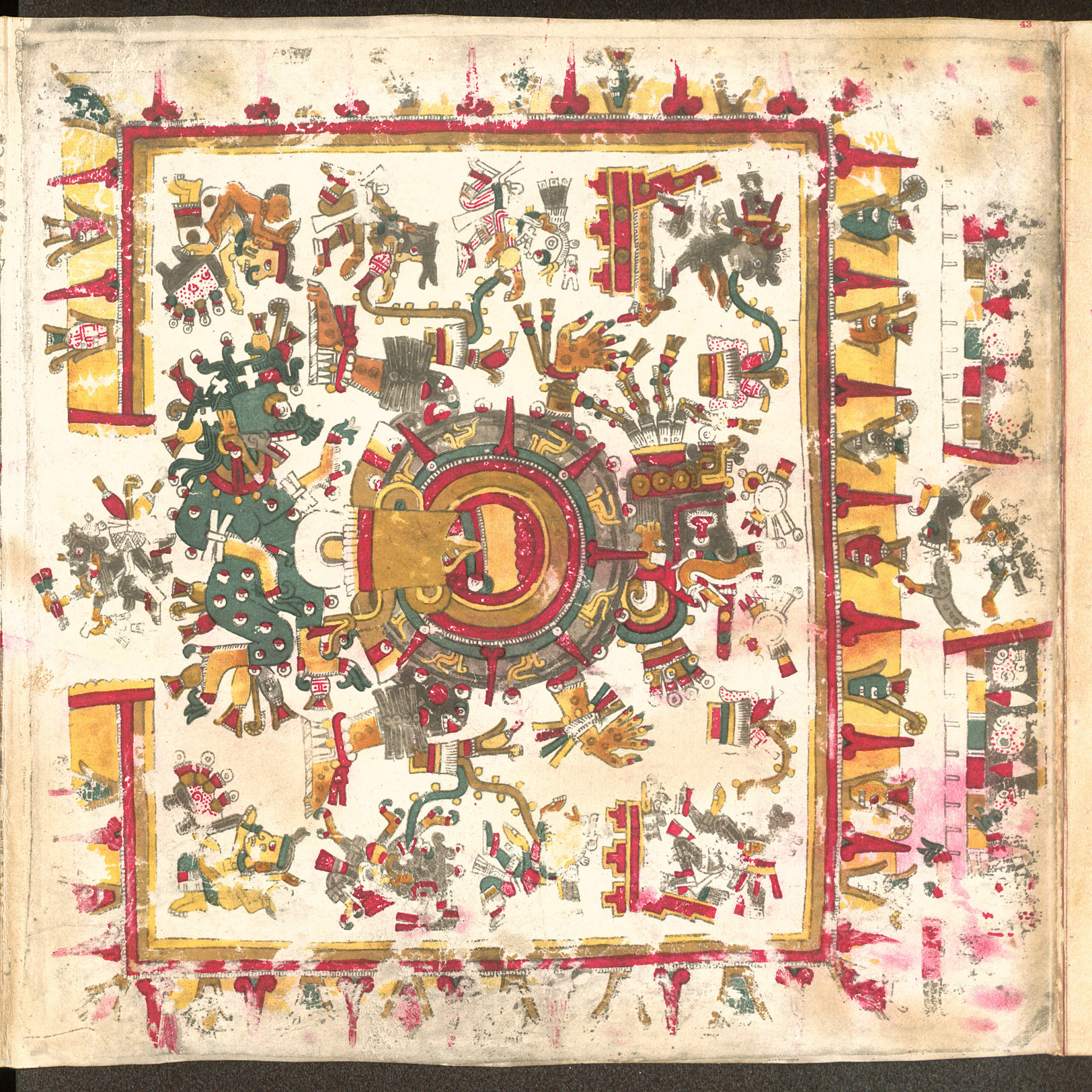
Page 43

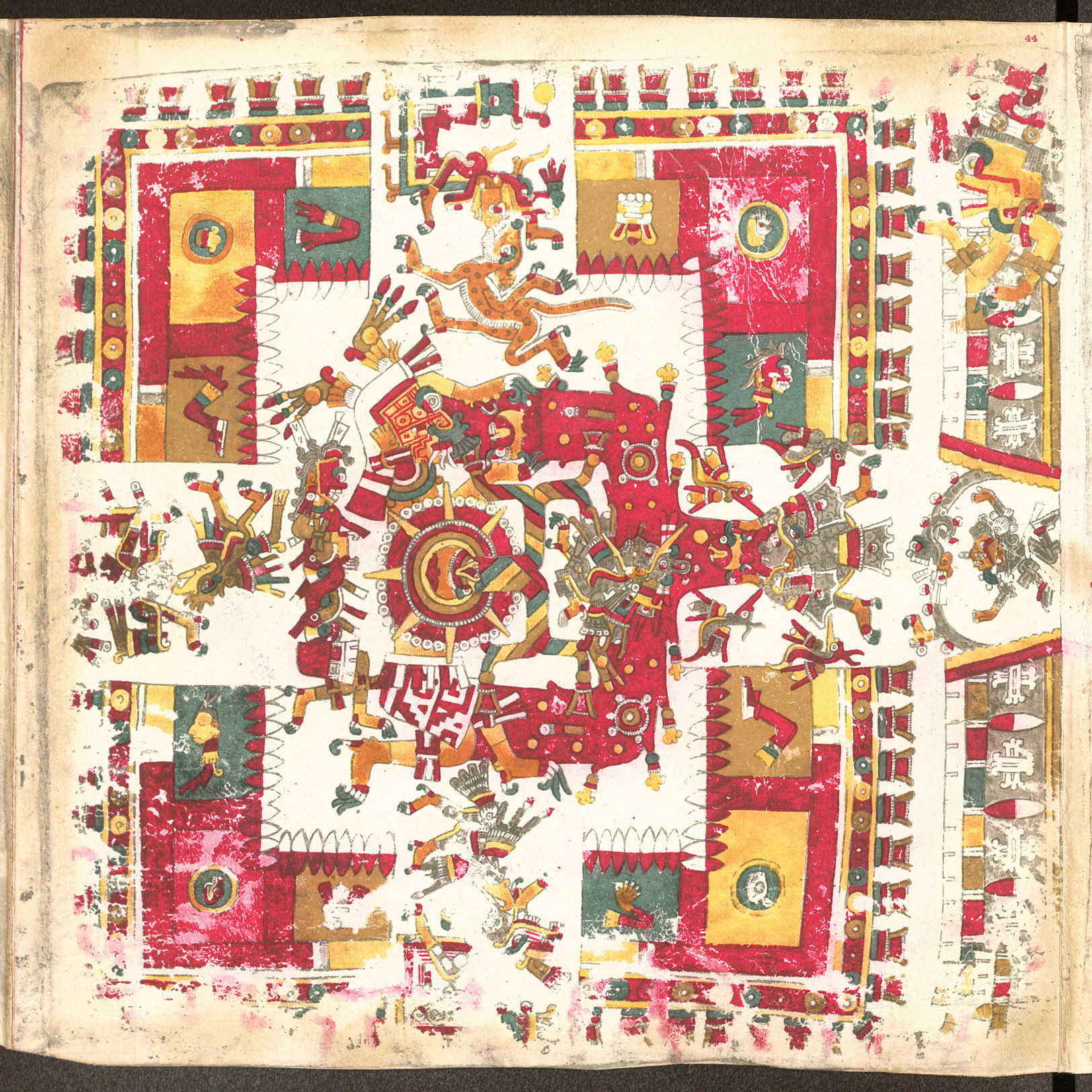
Page 44

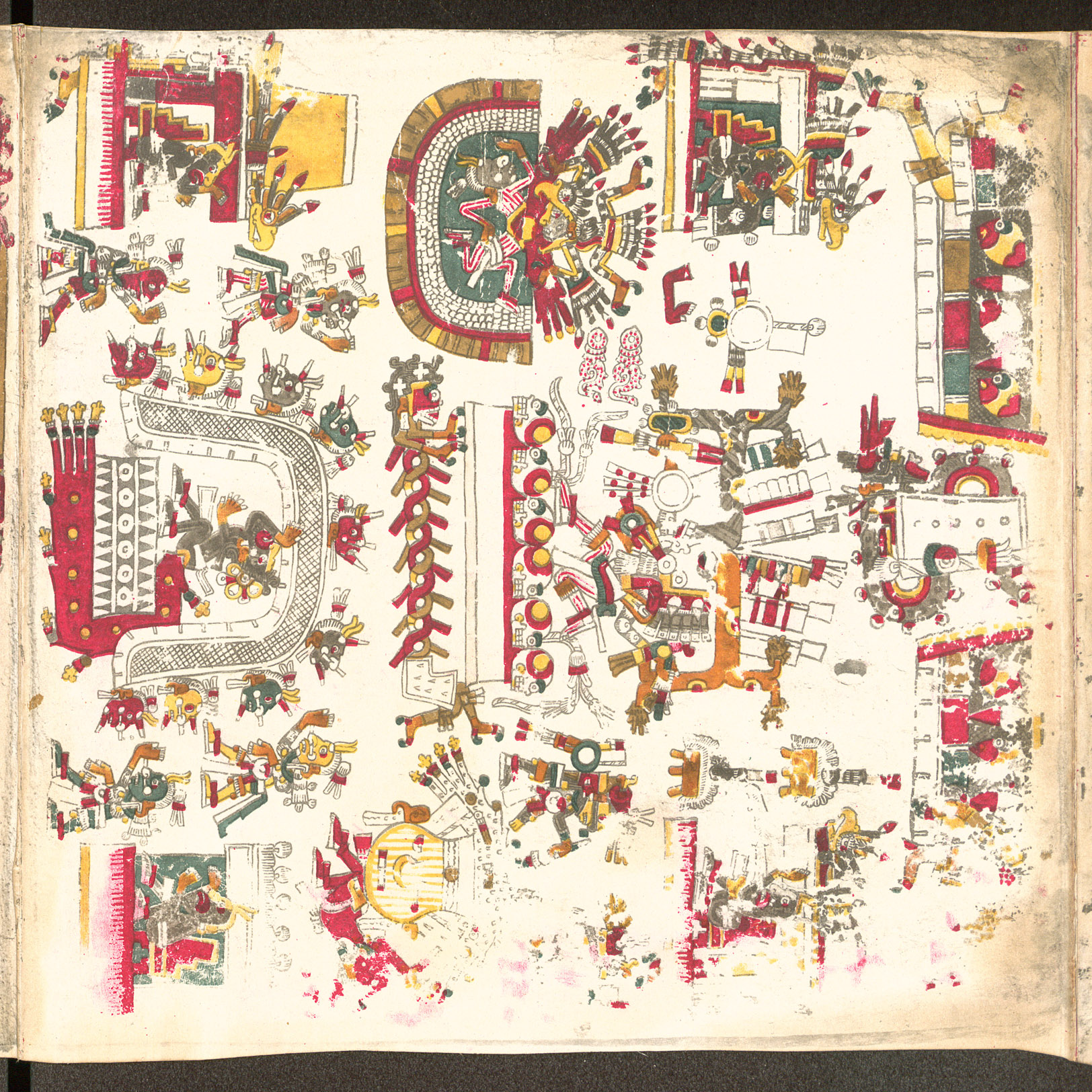
Page 45

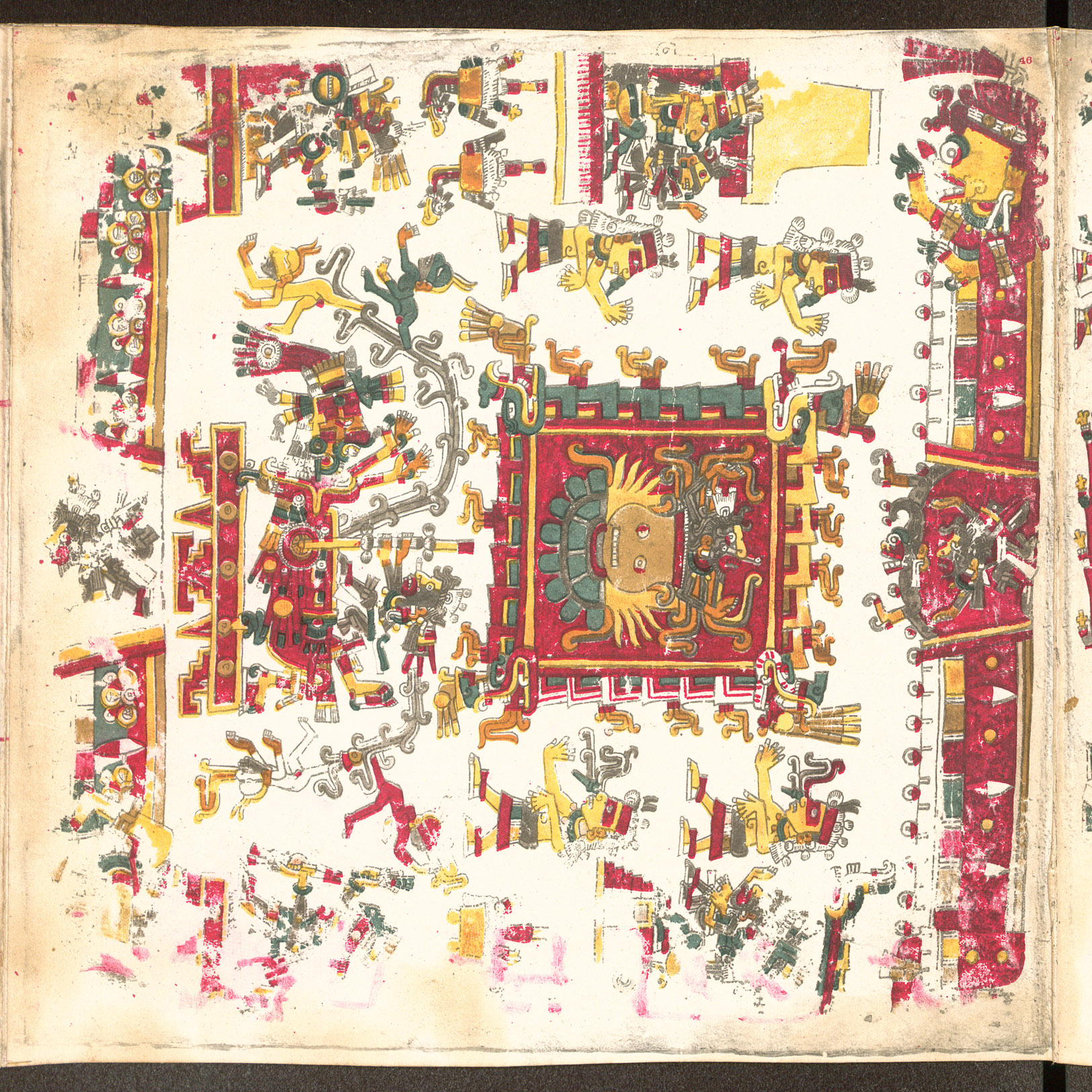
Page 46

=== Section 14: The Cihuateteo and the Macuitonaleque (47-48) ===
This section depicts the Cihuateteo, the divinized spirits of the women that died in child-birth, and the Macuiltonaleque, minor spirits of excess, pleasure and violence.

Images for pages 47-48

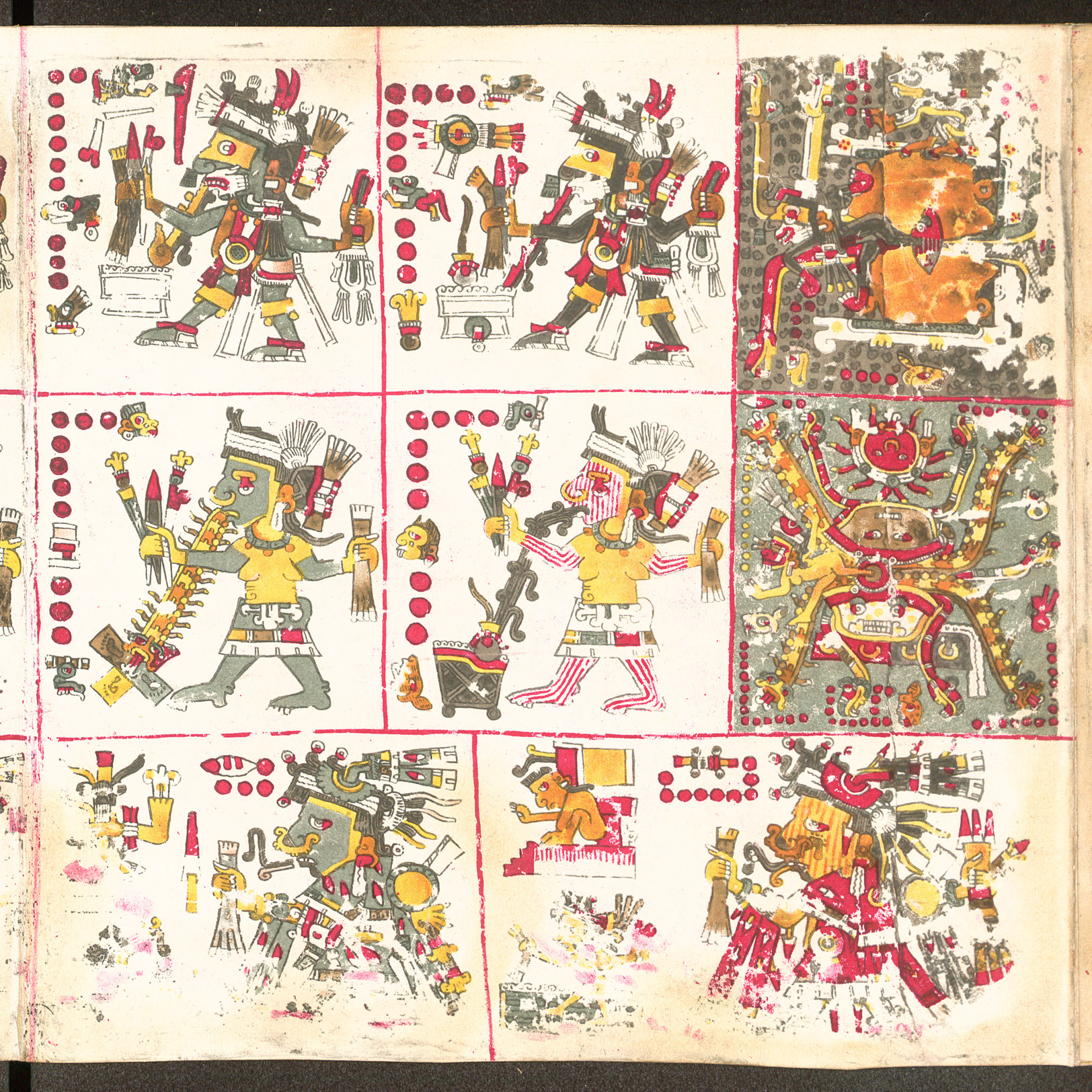

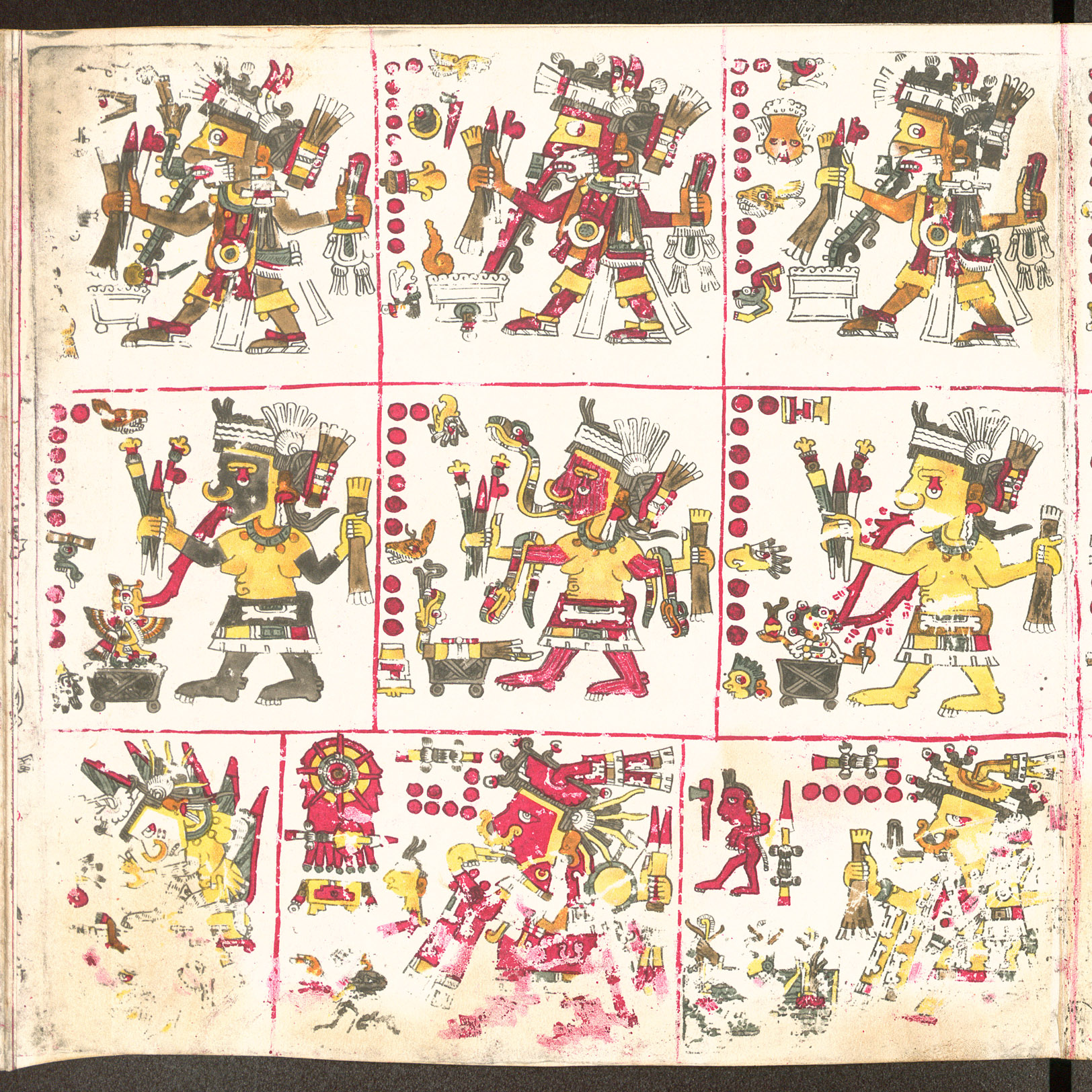

=== Section 15, 16, and 17: Directional Almanacs and the 'deer of our flesh' (50-53) ===
The directional almanacs depict the four quarters of the universe and the centre, and their corresponding day signs, sacred trees, and 'mantic images'. The 'deer of our flesh' or tonacayo mazatl is a corporeal almanac, associating parts of the human body figured as a deer with day-signs. Its meaning is not agreed: according to Codex Tudela, they are mere prognostications for people born at those birth signs, while Codex Rios suggest a medical use.

Images for pages 50-53

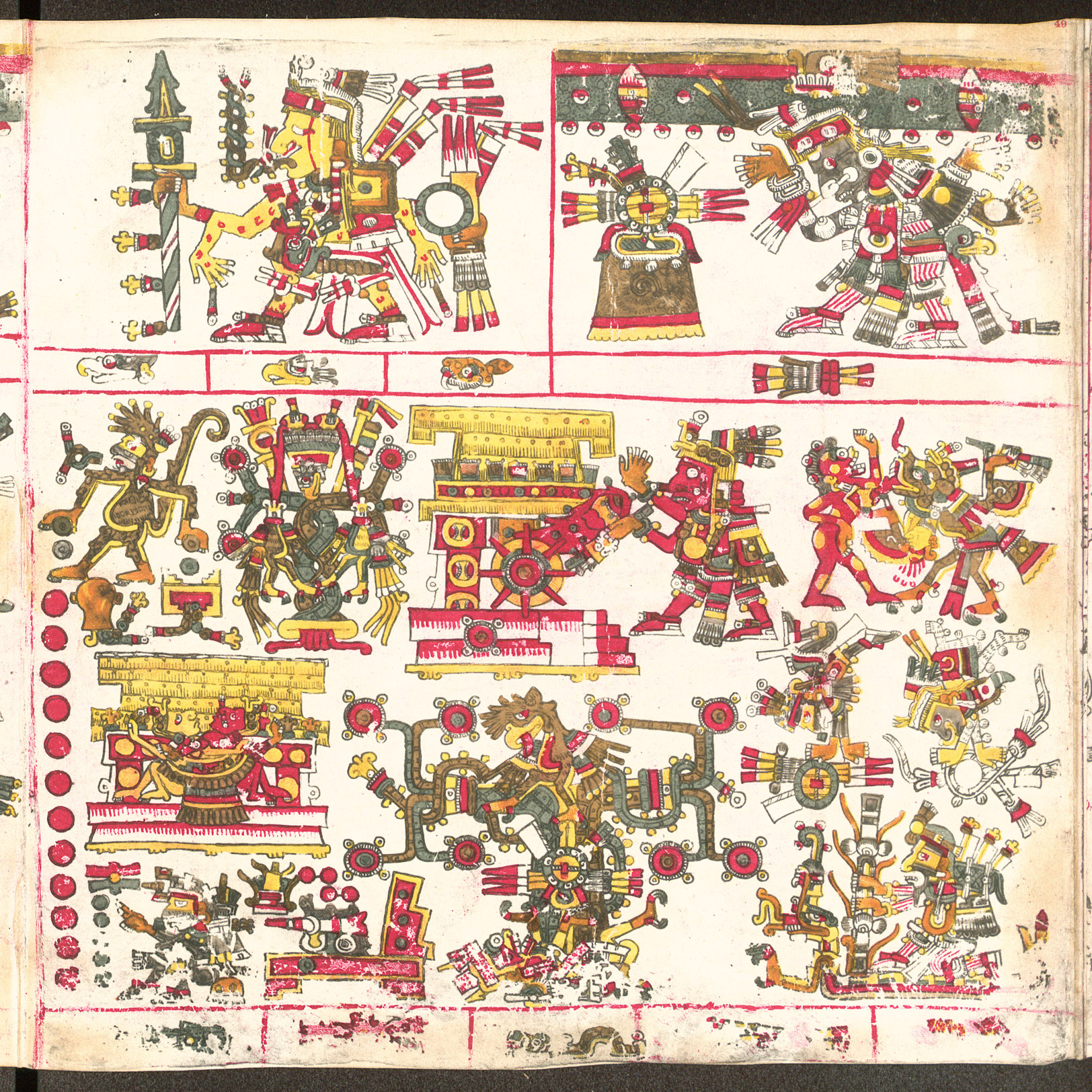

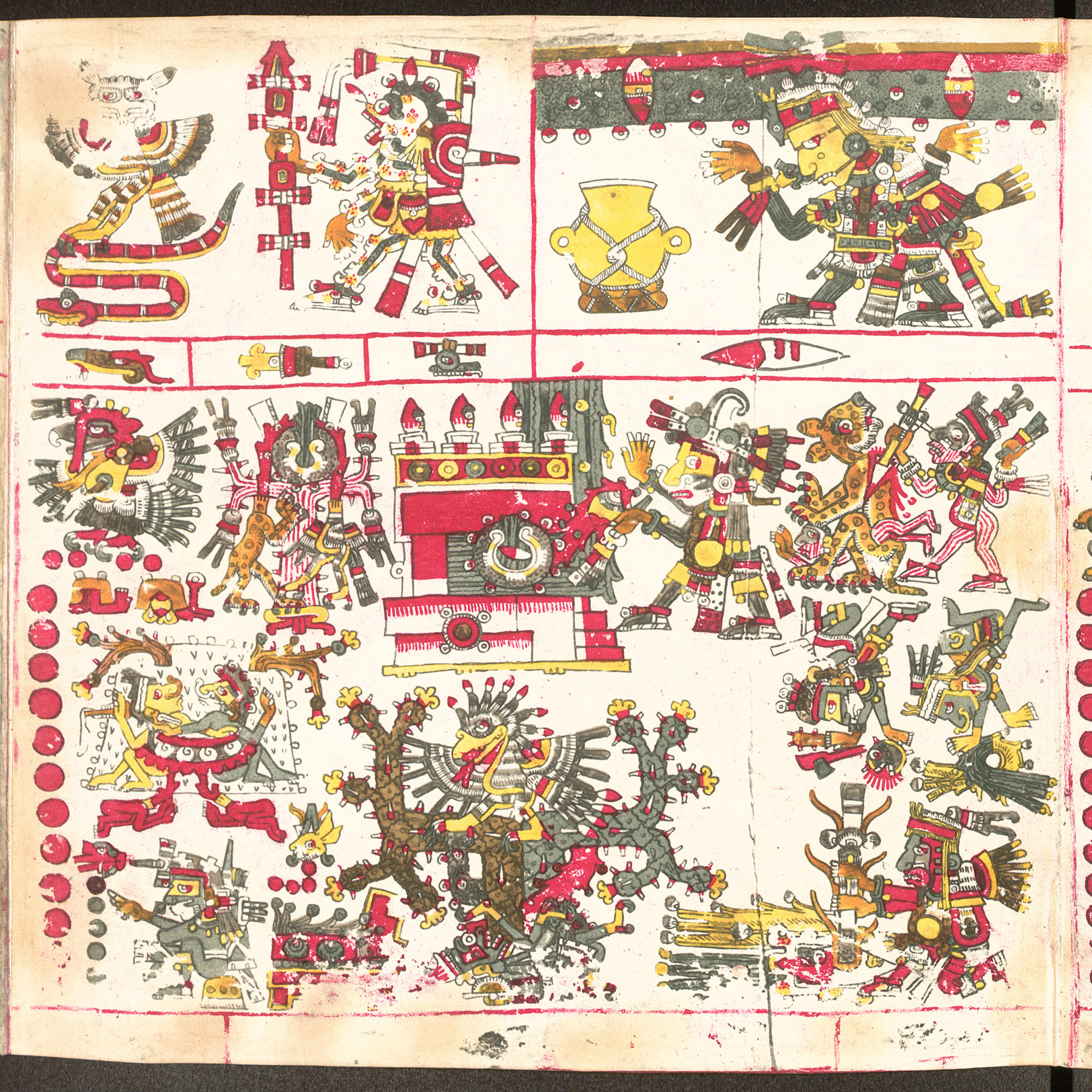

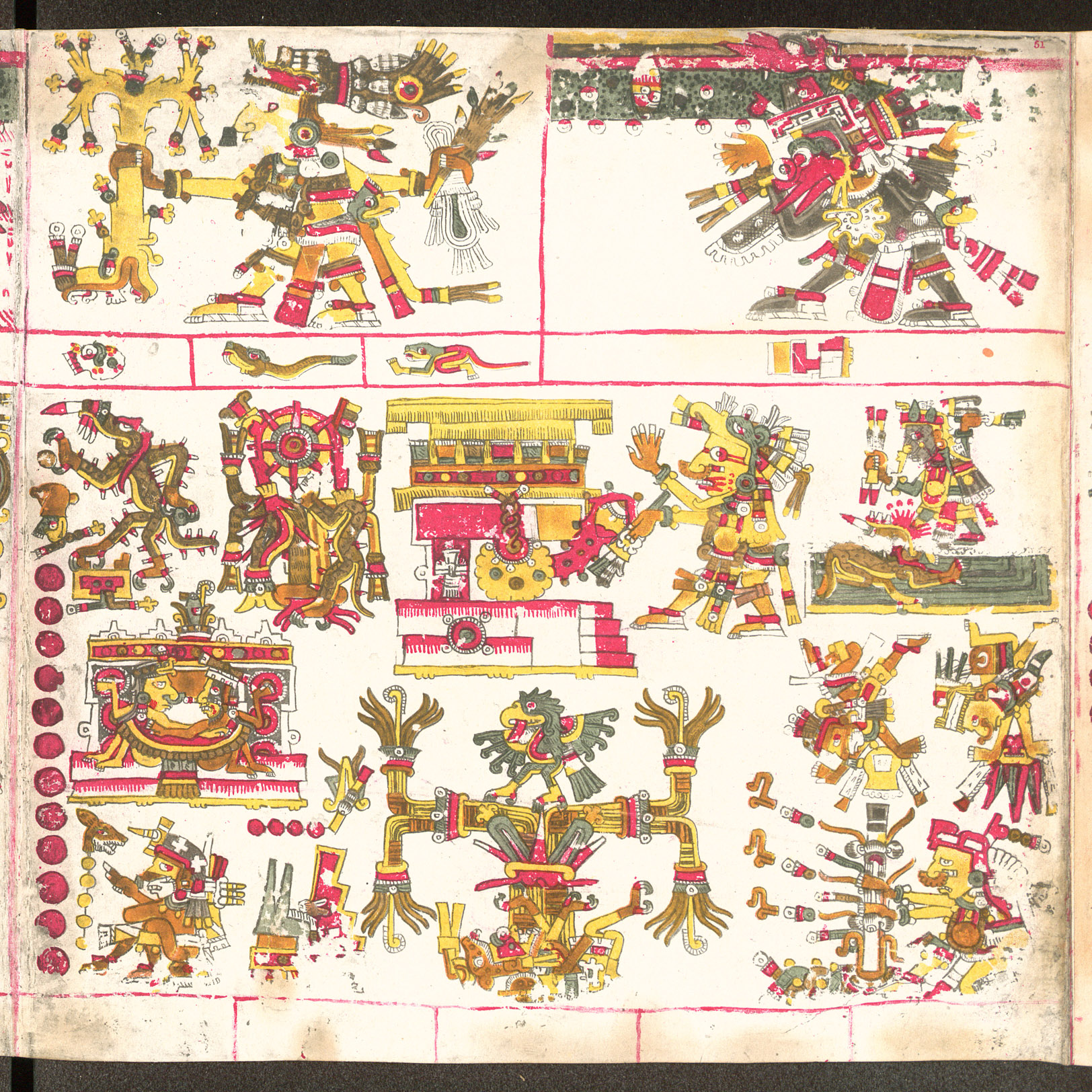

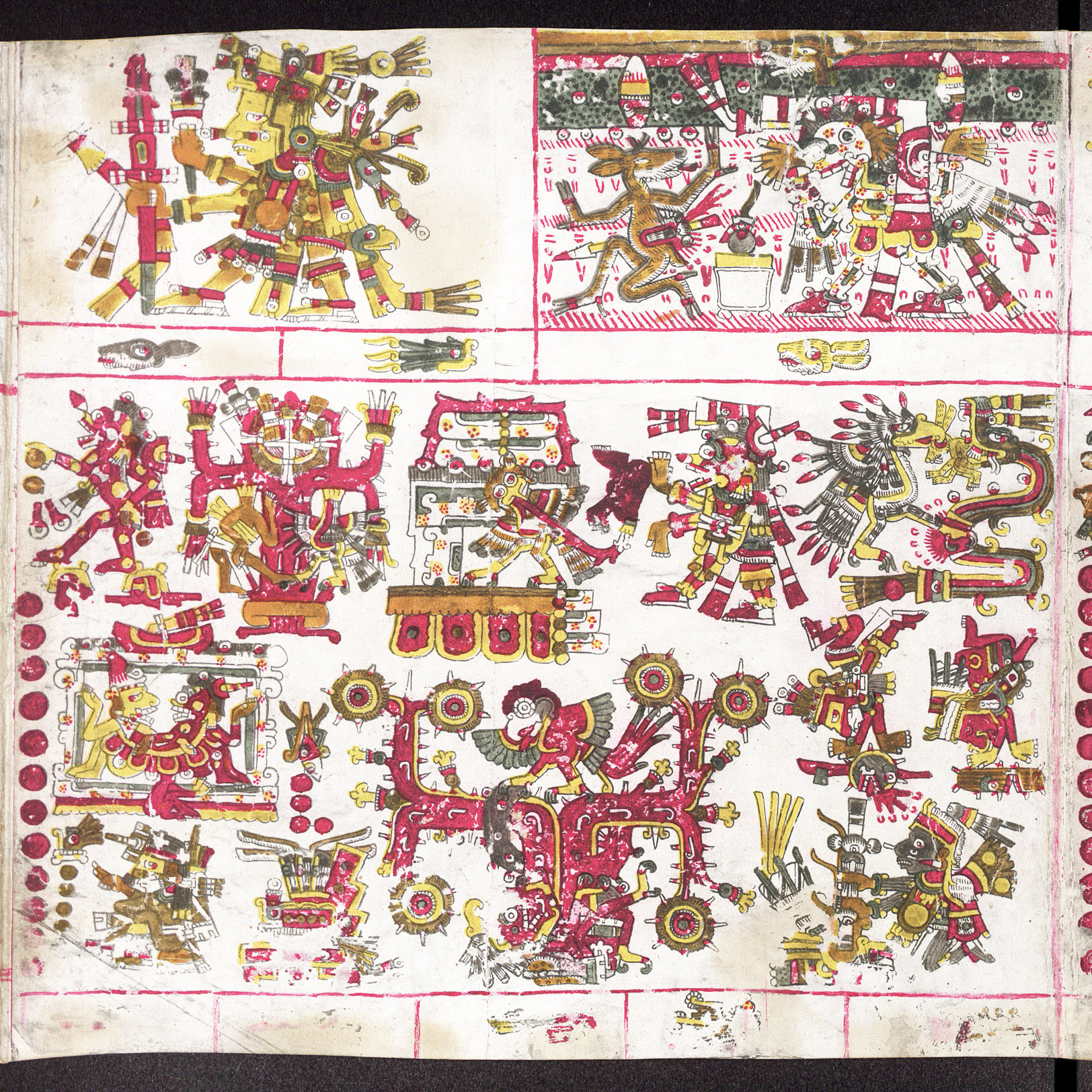

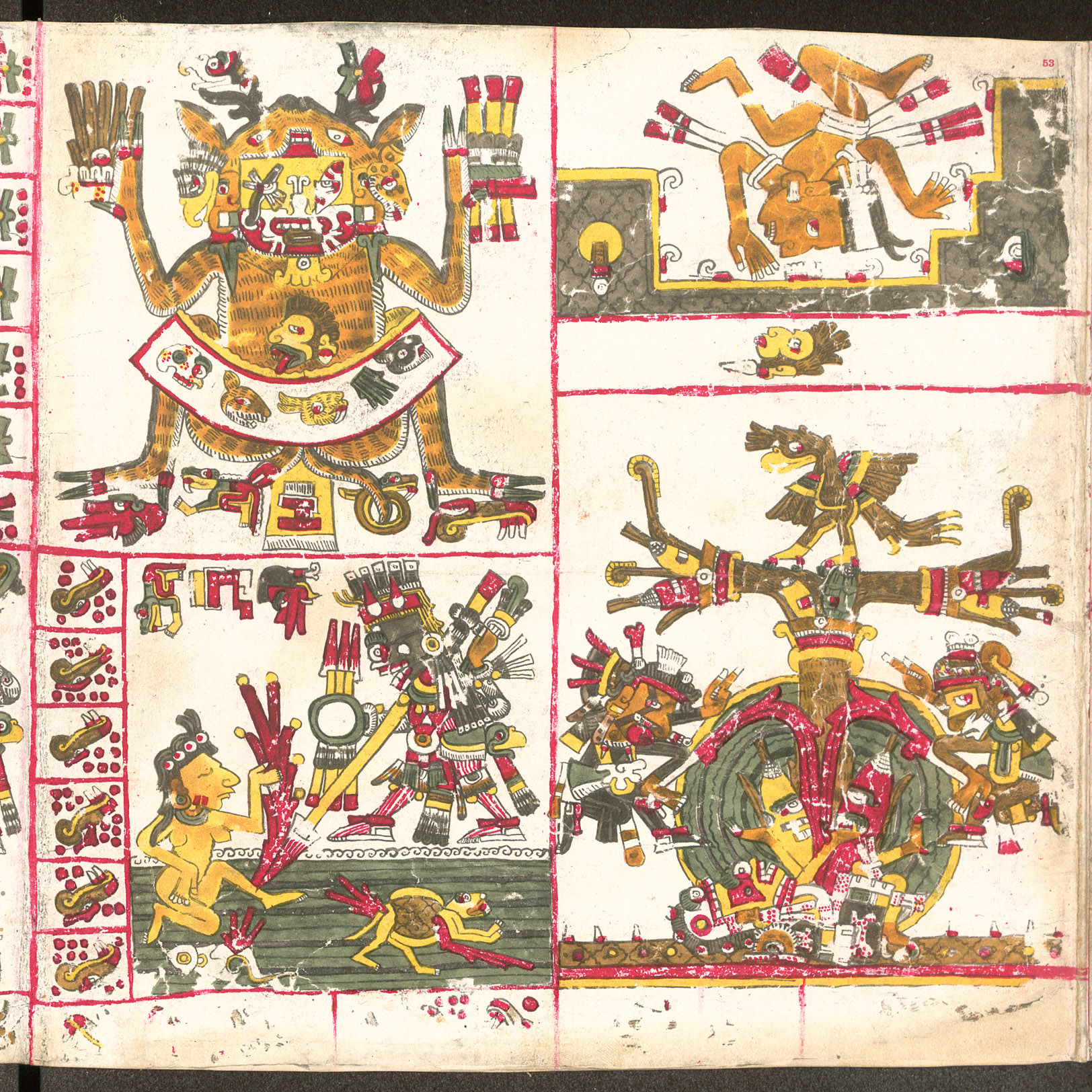

=== Section 18: The morning star (53-54) ===
This section starts in the lower left part of page 53 and continues throughout page 54. It is generally considered, following Seler, that the iconography depicts Venus as the morning star, piercing different characters or iconographic elements in different day-signs. Due to the mechanics of the Tonalpohualli, the heliacal rising of Venus can only happen in five day signs: Crocodile, Snake, Water, Reed and Movement. Thus, the prognostications associated to the rising of the planet in each day, as well as the next three days, are presented. The interpretation of the iconography of each unit has been related to water (Caiman, Wind, House, Lizard), polities (Snake, Death, Deer, Rabbit), earth and agriculture (Water, Dog, Monkey, Grass), rulers (Reed, Jaguar, Eagle and Vulture), and war (Movement, Flint, Storm, Flower). Recently the scholar Ana Díaz has questioned the calendrical mechanism present in these pages, which don't seem to be fit for this astronomical calculation; however, hieroglyphic evidence from Seibal in the Maya area and the heavily Toltec-influenced Maya Codex of Mexico, the oldest Venus almanac in Mesoamerica, suggest that these calculations are central Mexican in origin, rather than Maya.

Images for pages 53-54

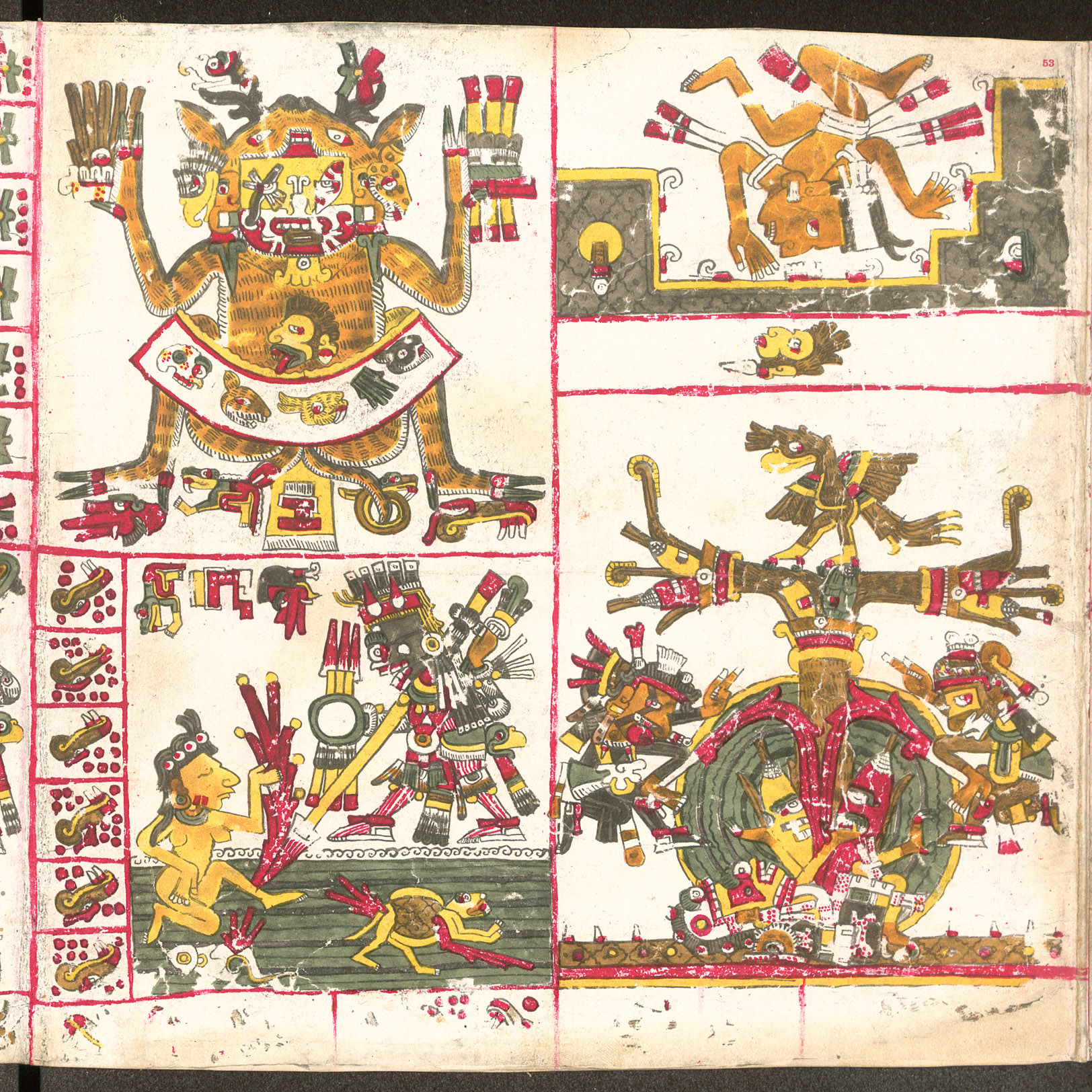

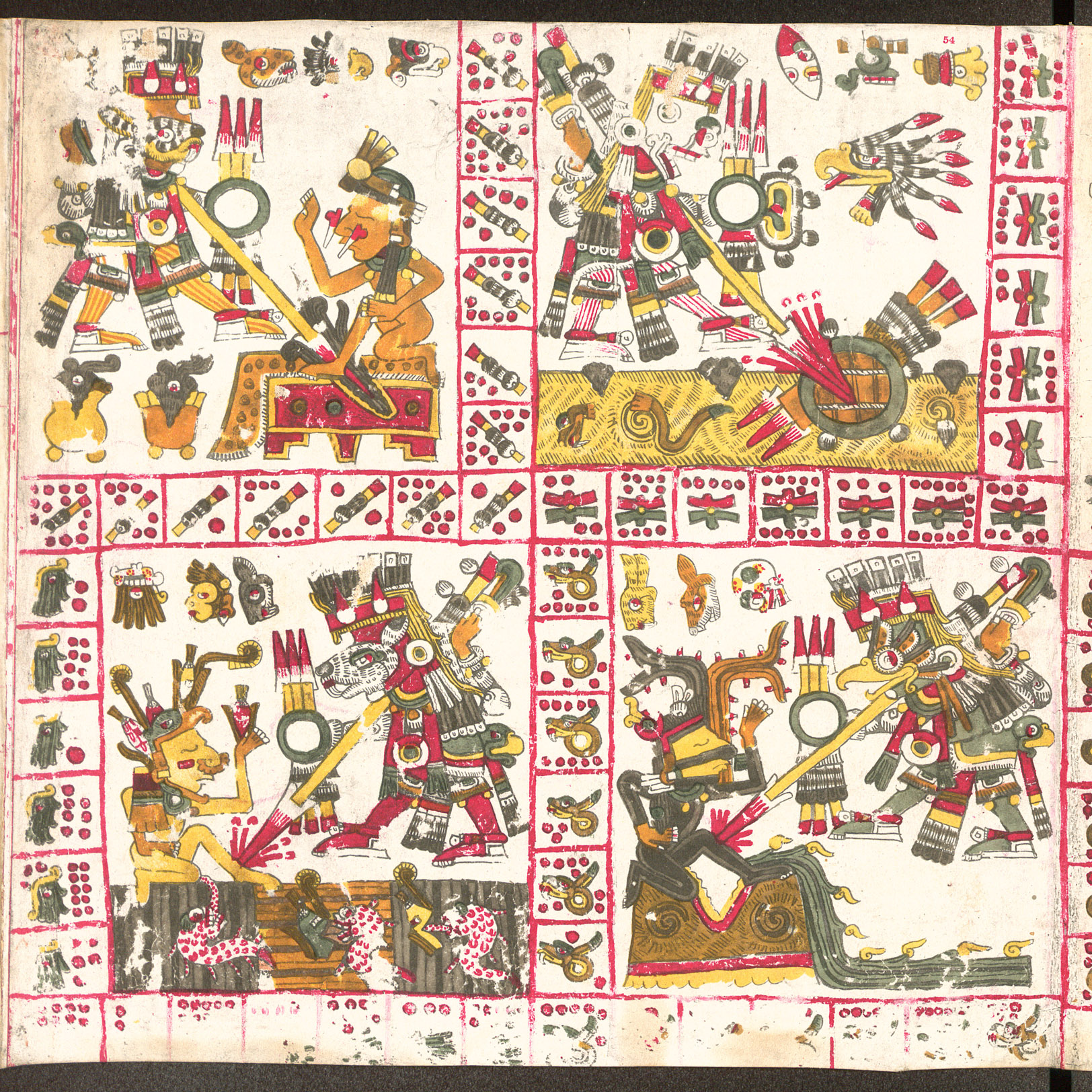

=== Section 19: The gods of the merchants (55) ===
This section depicts day-signs associated to different deities represented as travellers or merchants, and their associated prognostications.

Image for page 55

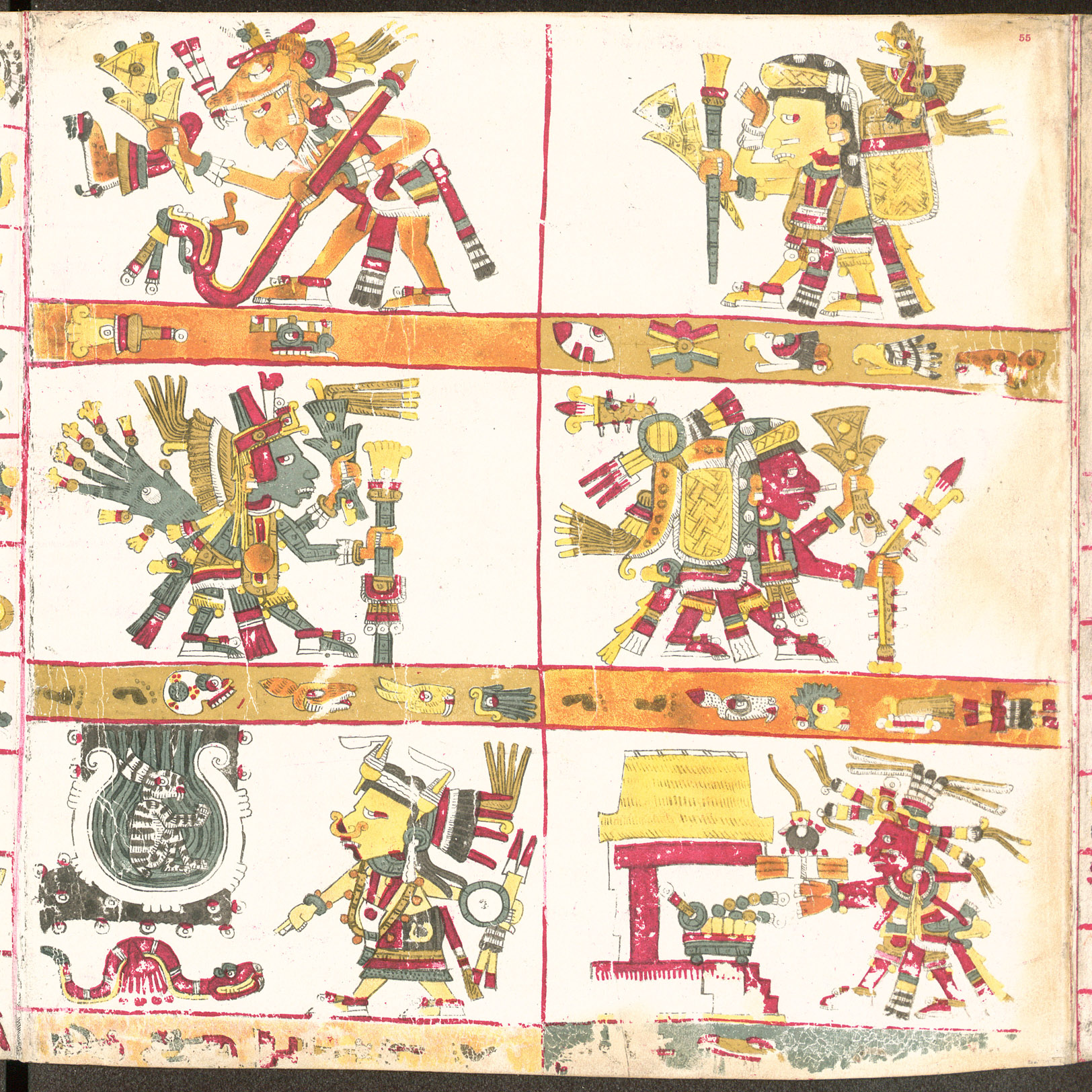

=== Section 20: The Tonalpohualli divided among Quetzalcoatl and Mictlantecuhtli (56) ===
This page depicts Mictlantecuhtli and Quetzalcoatl back to back. The purpose is unknown, but perhaps it was related to life and death prognostications in medicine.

Image for page 56

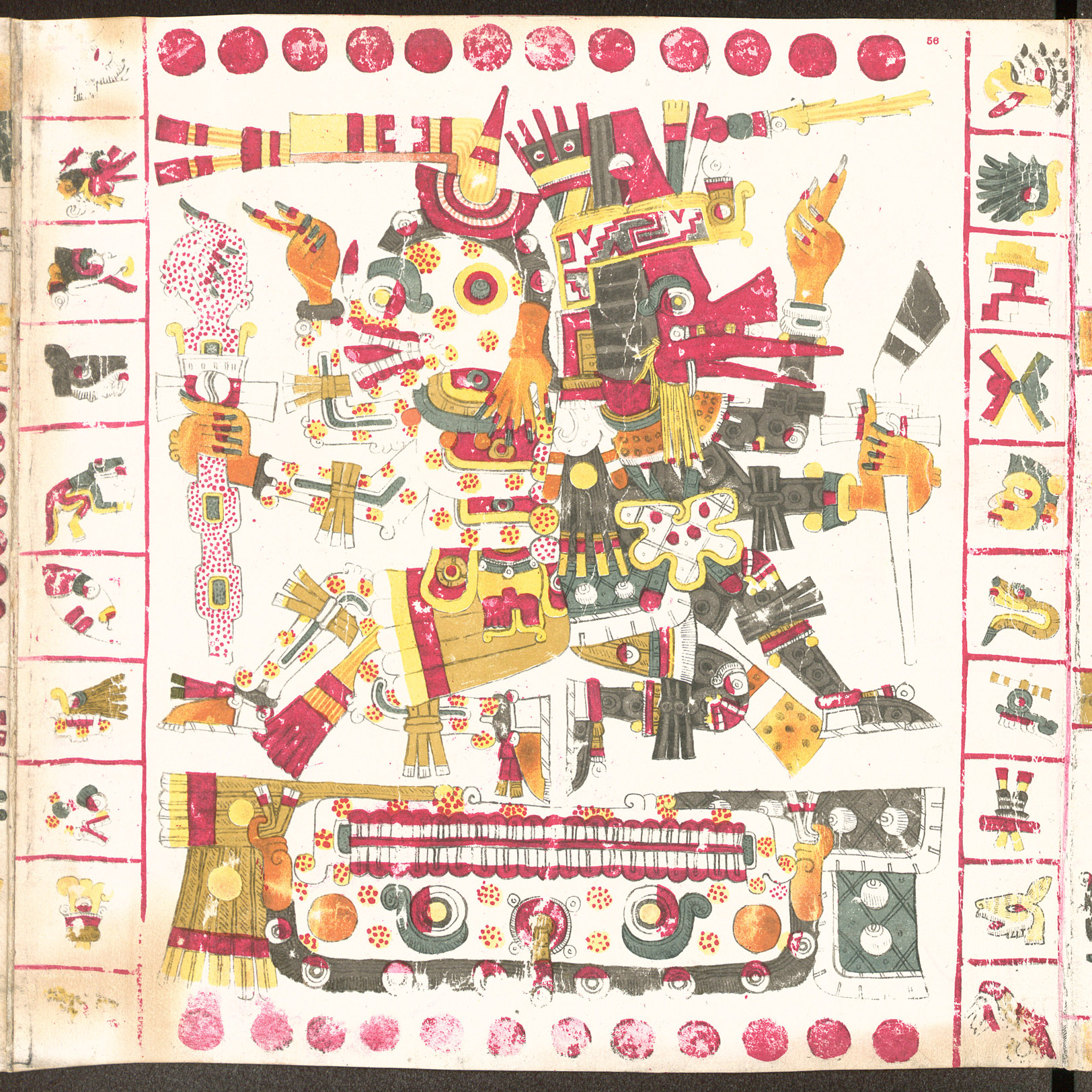

=== Section 21 and 22: Marriage Prognostications ===
This section comprises prognostications for marriages. The coefficient of the Tonalpohualli birth-sign of the groom and the bride (comprising from 1 to 13) are added, and the resulting sum is compared to each of the images, which go from 2, the lowest result, to 26, the highest. The prognostication is given by the iconography: in general, even numbers are unlucky, odd, lucky.

Images for pages 57-60

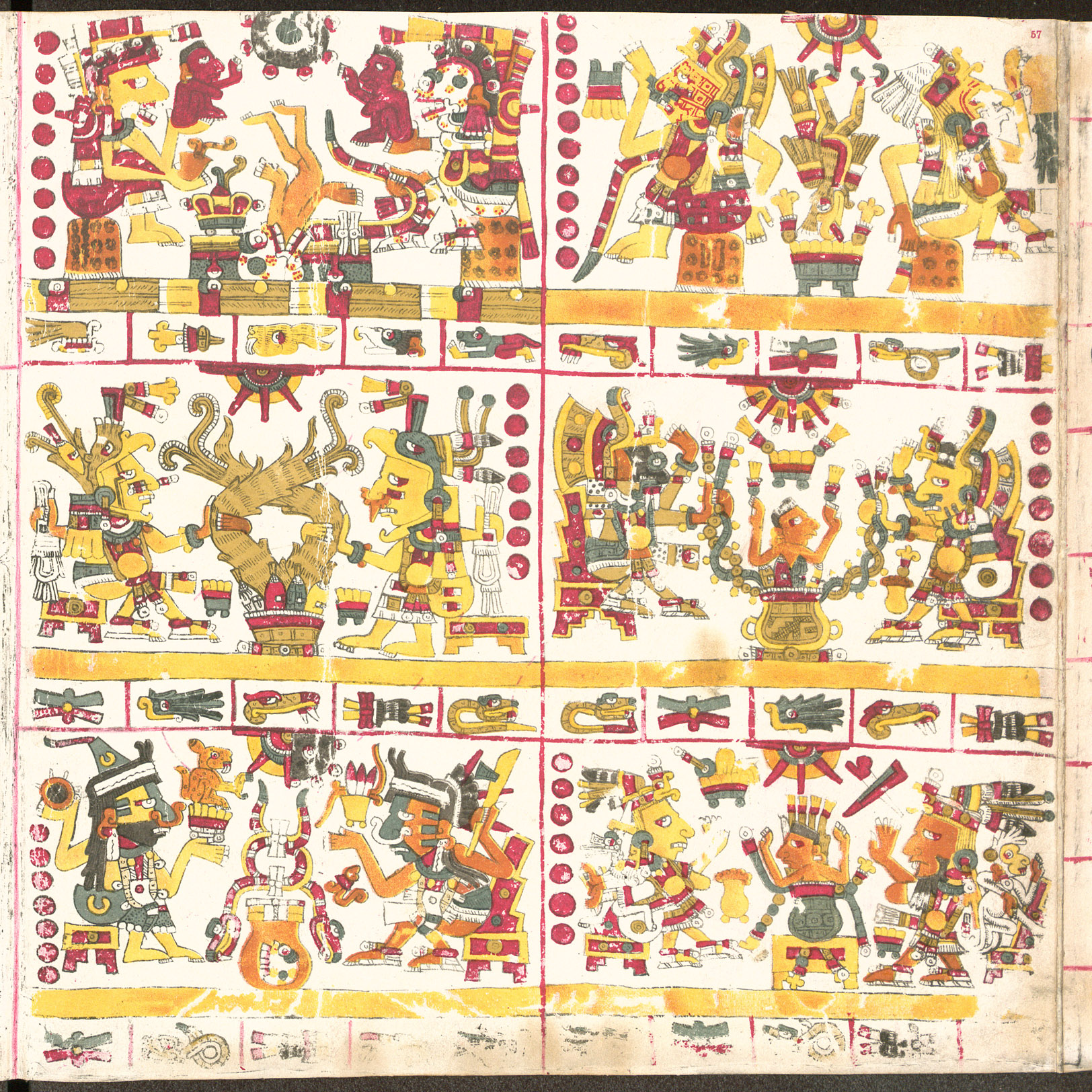

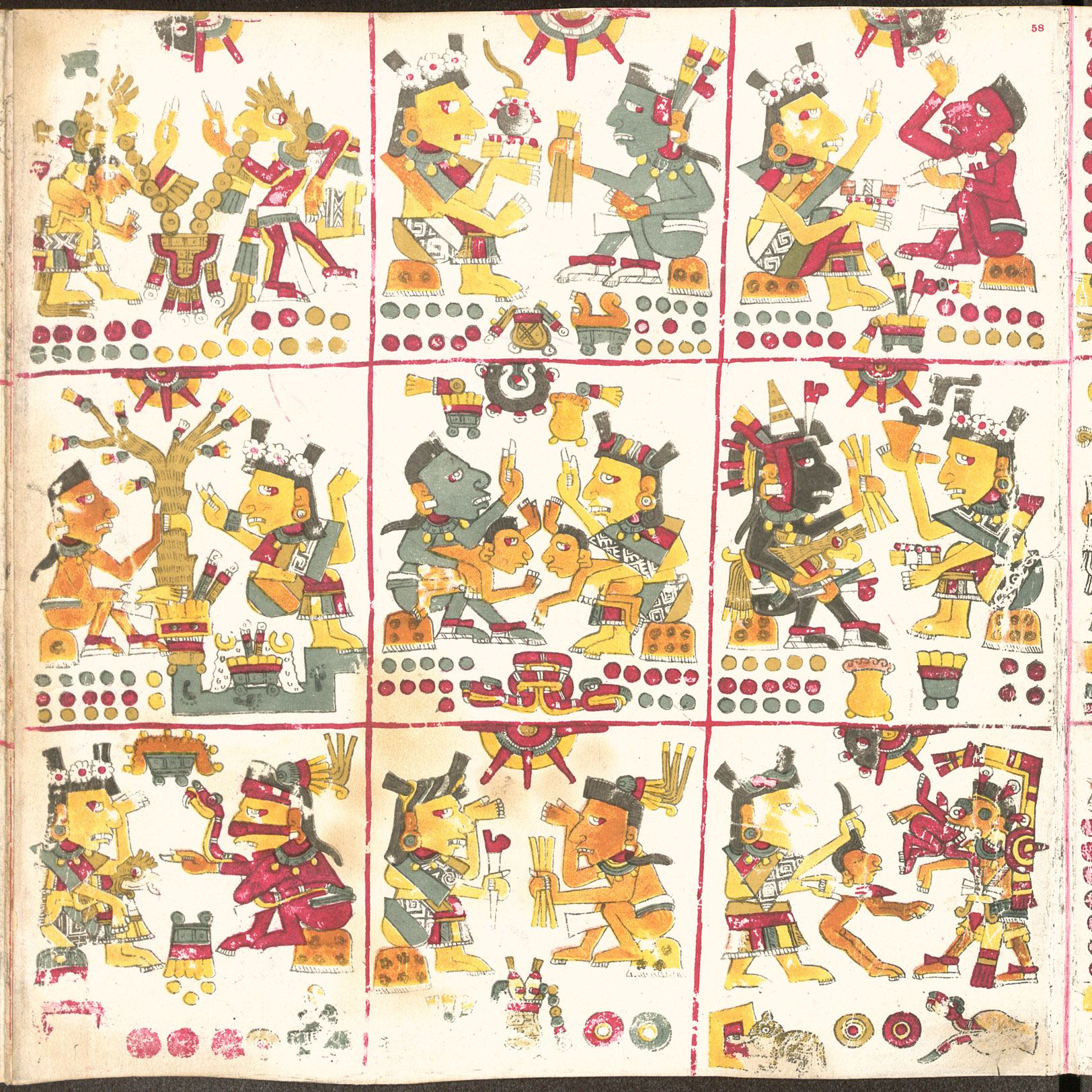

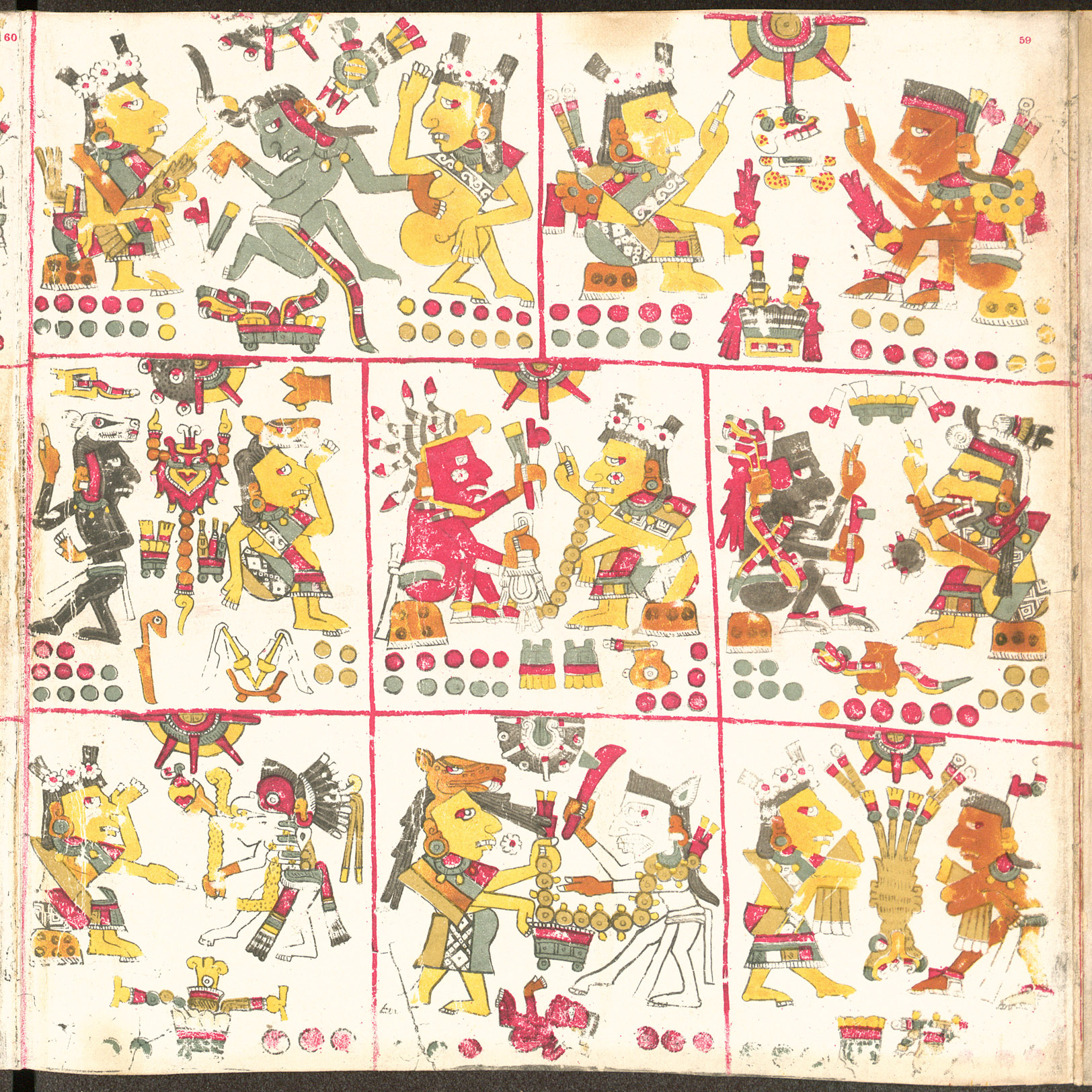

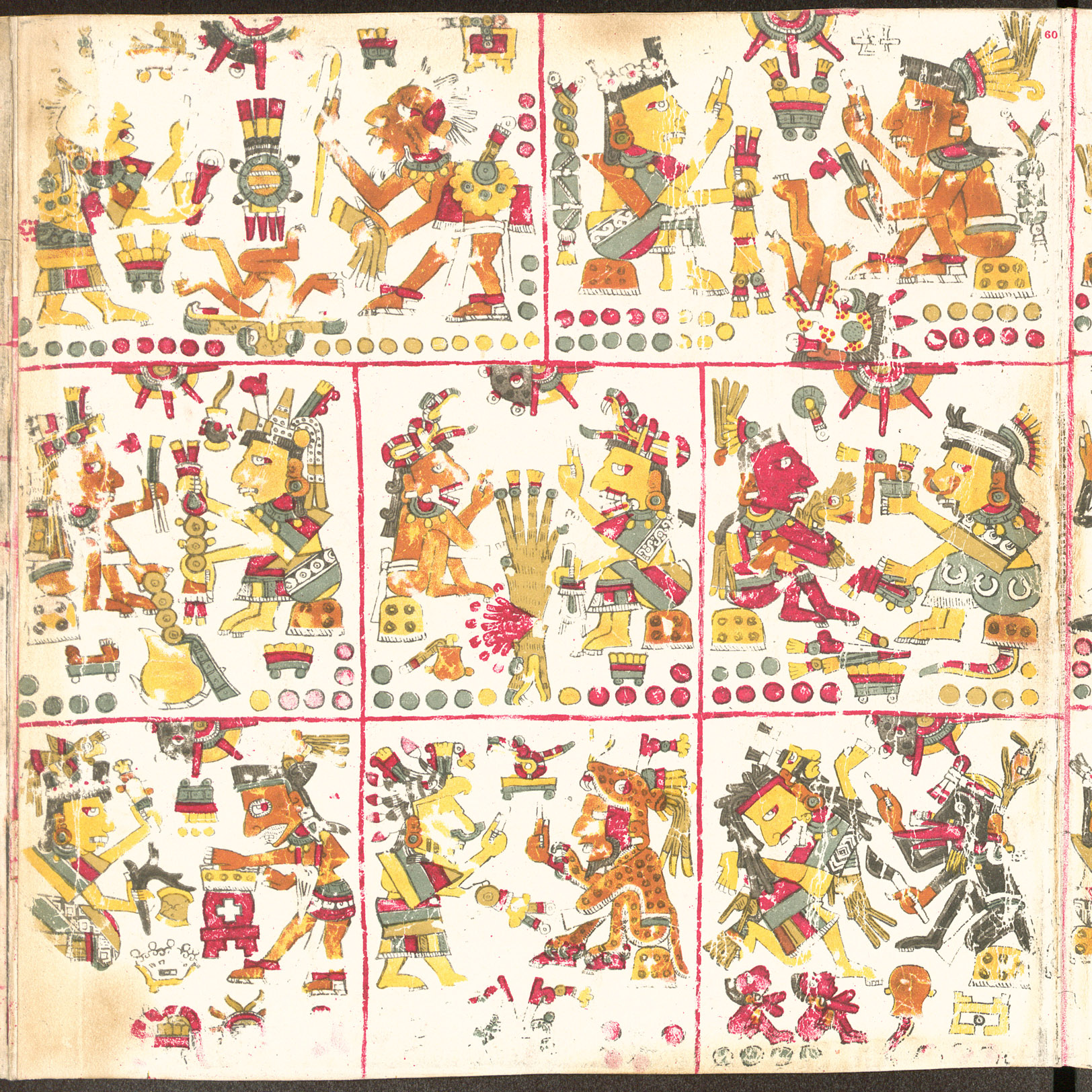

=== Section 23 and 24: The twenty 13-day 'weeks' or trecenas of the Tonalpohualli, and the auguric birds of each day (61-70) ===
A complete tonalpohualli, comprising the twenty 13-day periods which were known as trecenas in Spanish, which some chroniclers considered equivalent to weeks in the Gregorian calendar. Each trecena is named after its initial day-sign, and each has a patron god which determines if it is either lucky or unlucky. Trecenas, patron gods and prognostications are the following, according to the glosses in Codex Borbonicus:

1. One Caiman, Tonacatecuhtli
2. One Jaguar, Ehecatl
3. One Deer, Tepeyollotl
4. One Flower, Huehuecoyotl
5. One Reed, Chalchiuhtlicue
6. One Death, Tonatiuh
7. One Rain, Tlaloc
8. One Grass, Mayahuel
9. One Snake, Xiuhtecuhtli
10. One Flint, Mictlantecuhtli
11. One Monkey, Patecatl
12. One Lizard, Ixtlacoliuhqui
13. One Movement, Tlazolteotl
14. One Dog, Xipe Totec
15. One House, Itzpapalotl
16. One Vulture, Xolotl
17. One Water, Chalchiuhtotolin
18. One Wind, Chantico
19. One Eagle, Xochiquetzal
20. One Rabbit, Xiuhtecuhtli

The final page of this section depicts the sun god, Tonatiuh, receiving offerings, and states the sacred flying animals associated to each day.

Images of pages 61–71

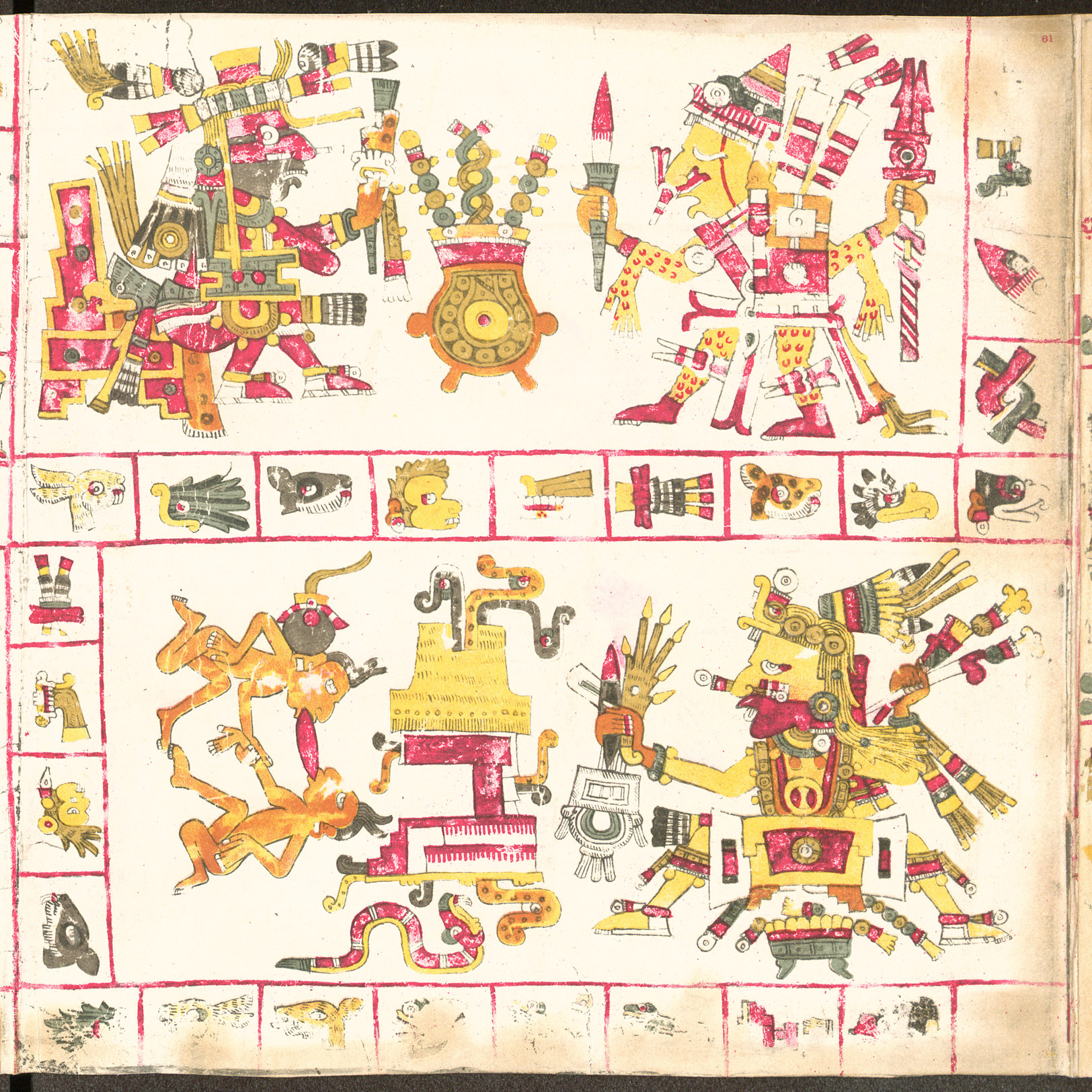
Page 61

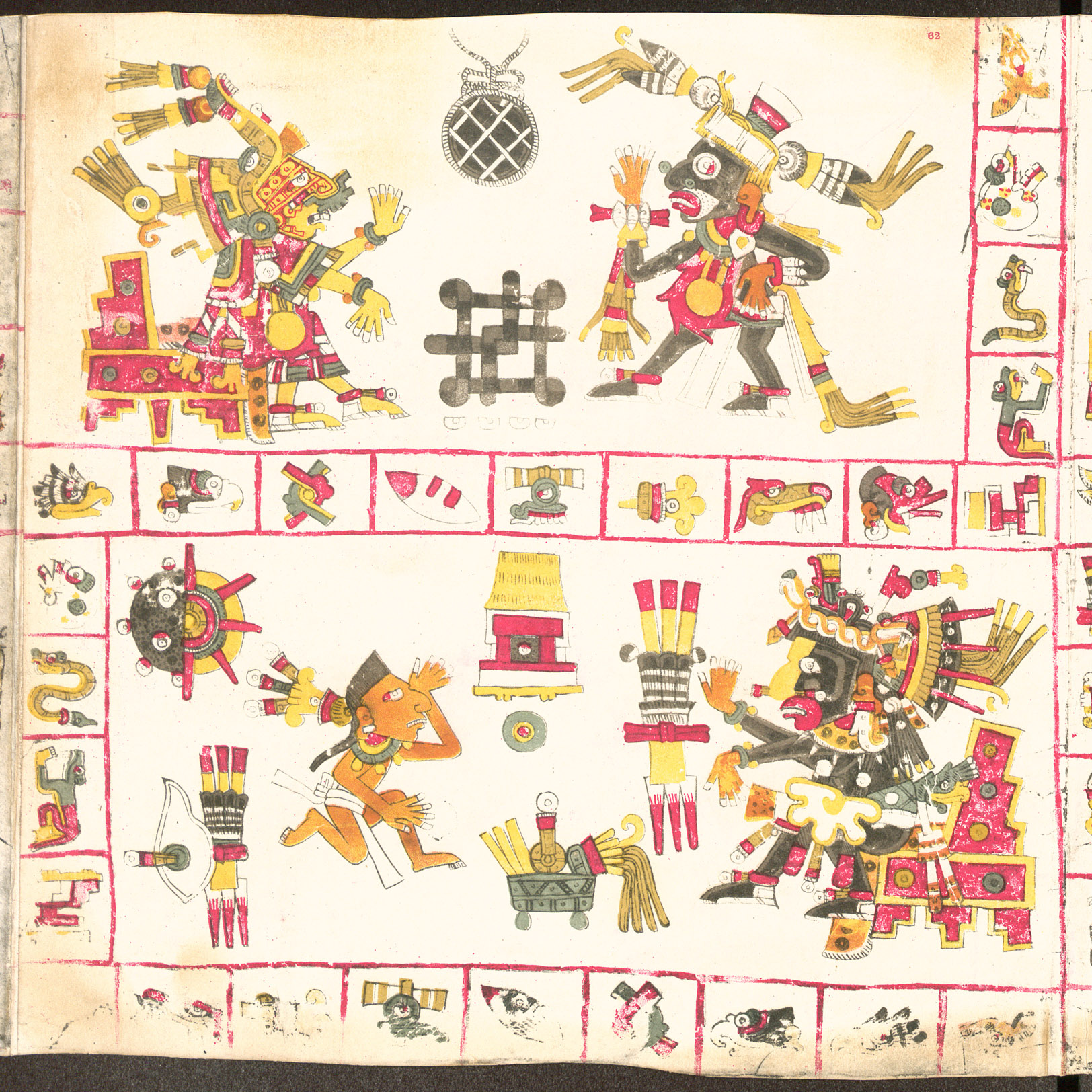
Page 62

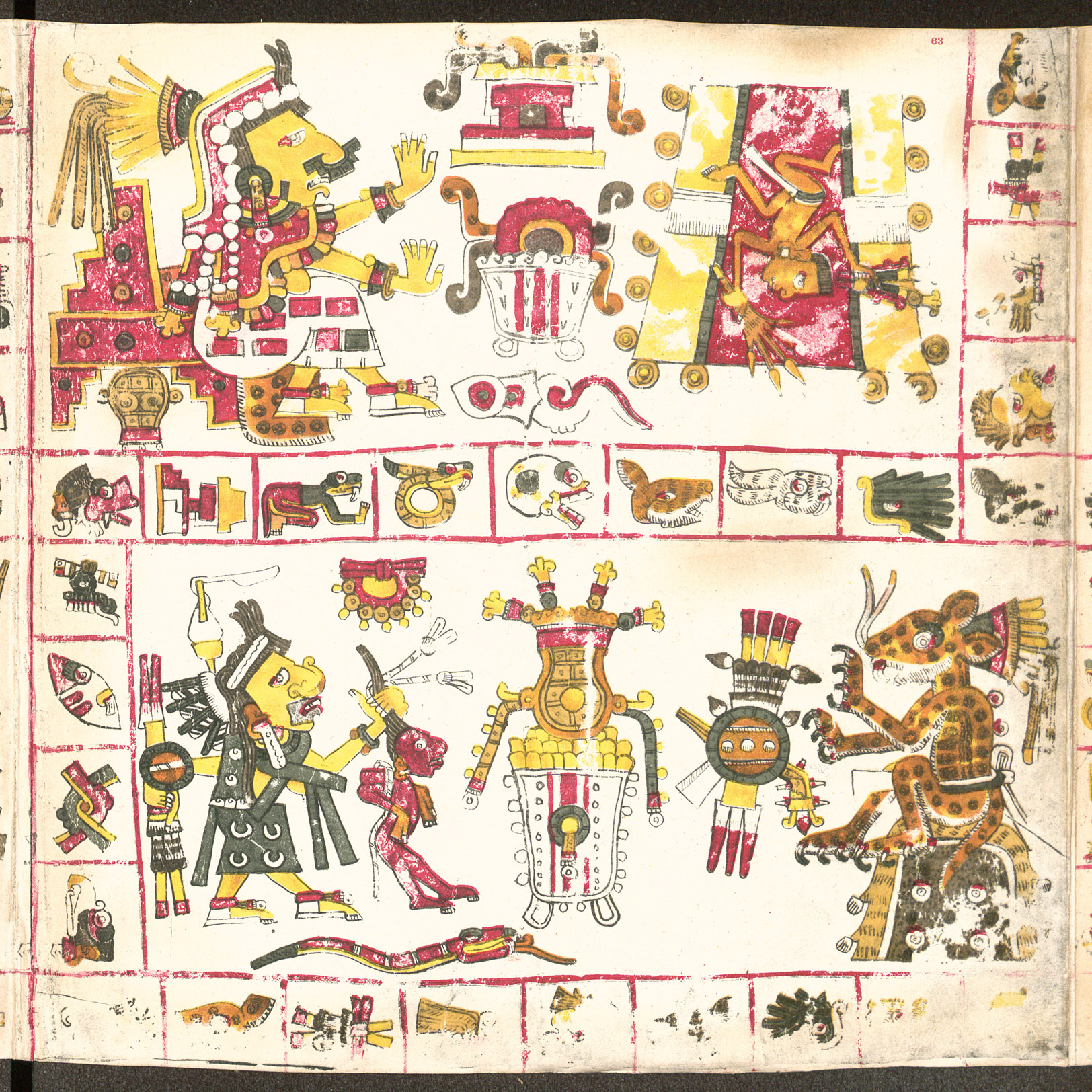
Page 63

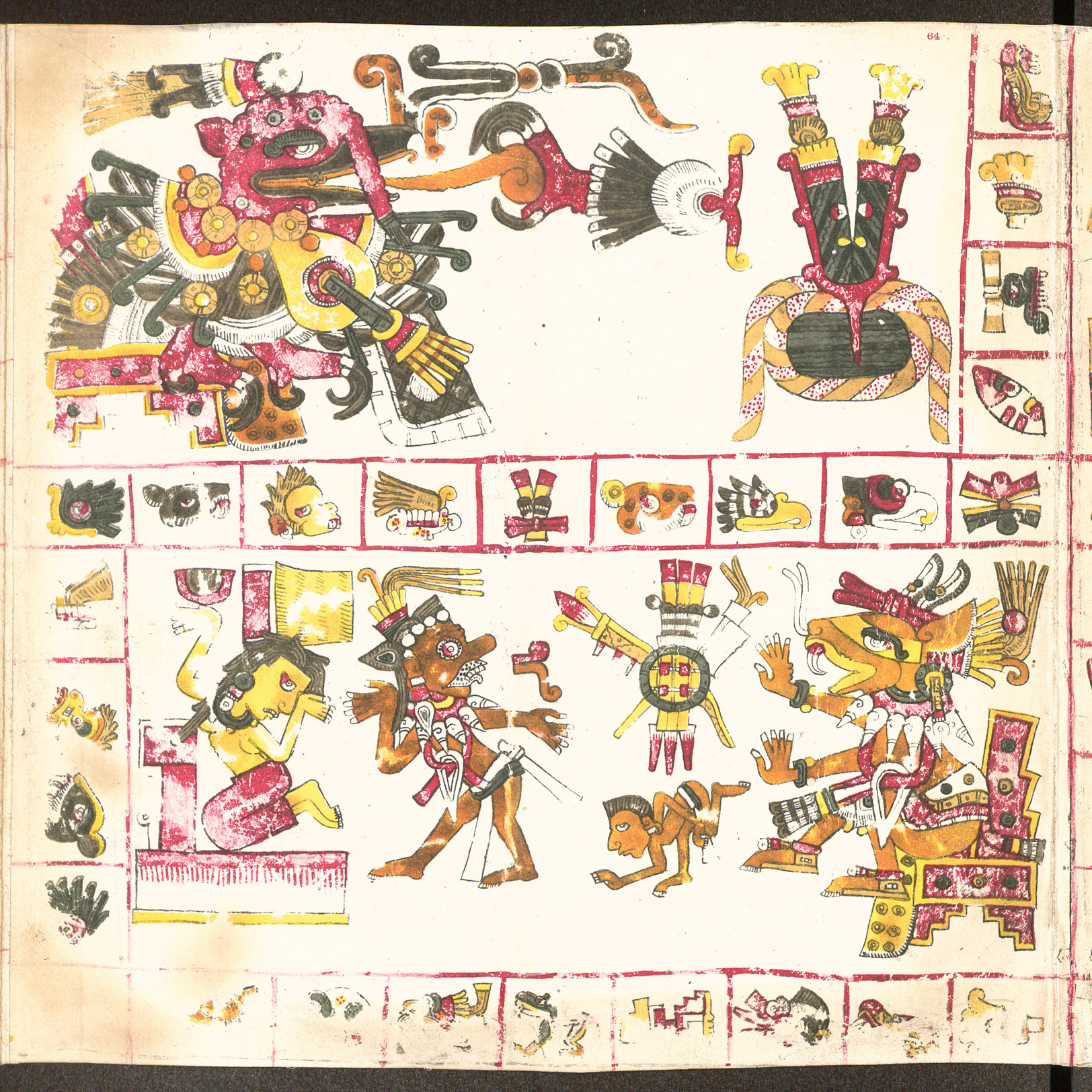
Page 64

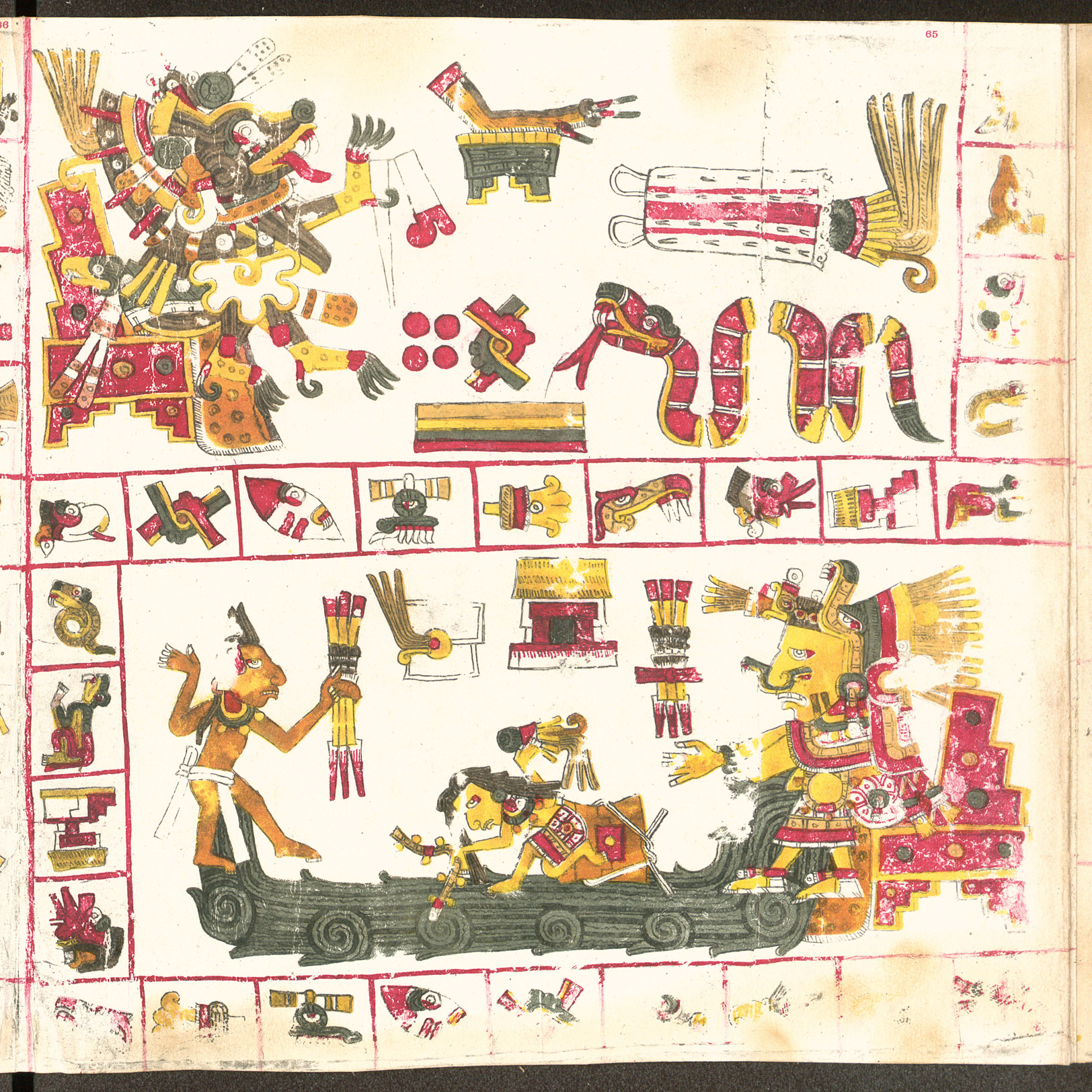
Page 65

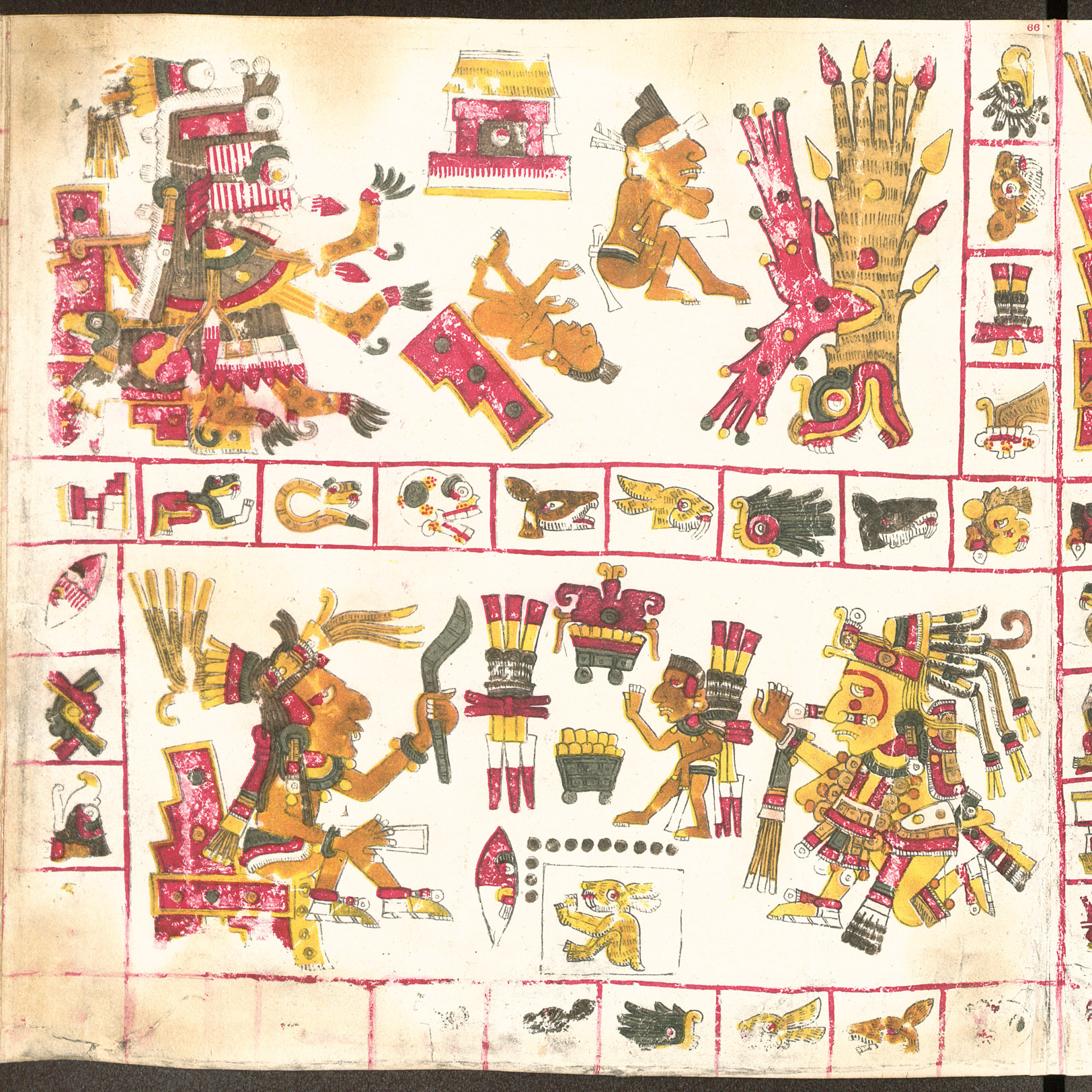
Page 66

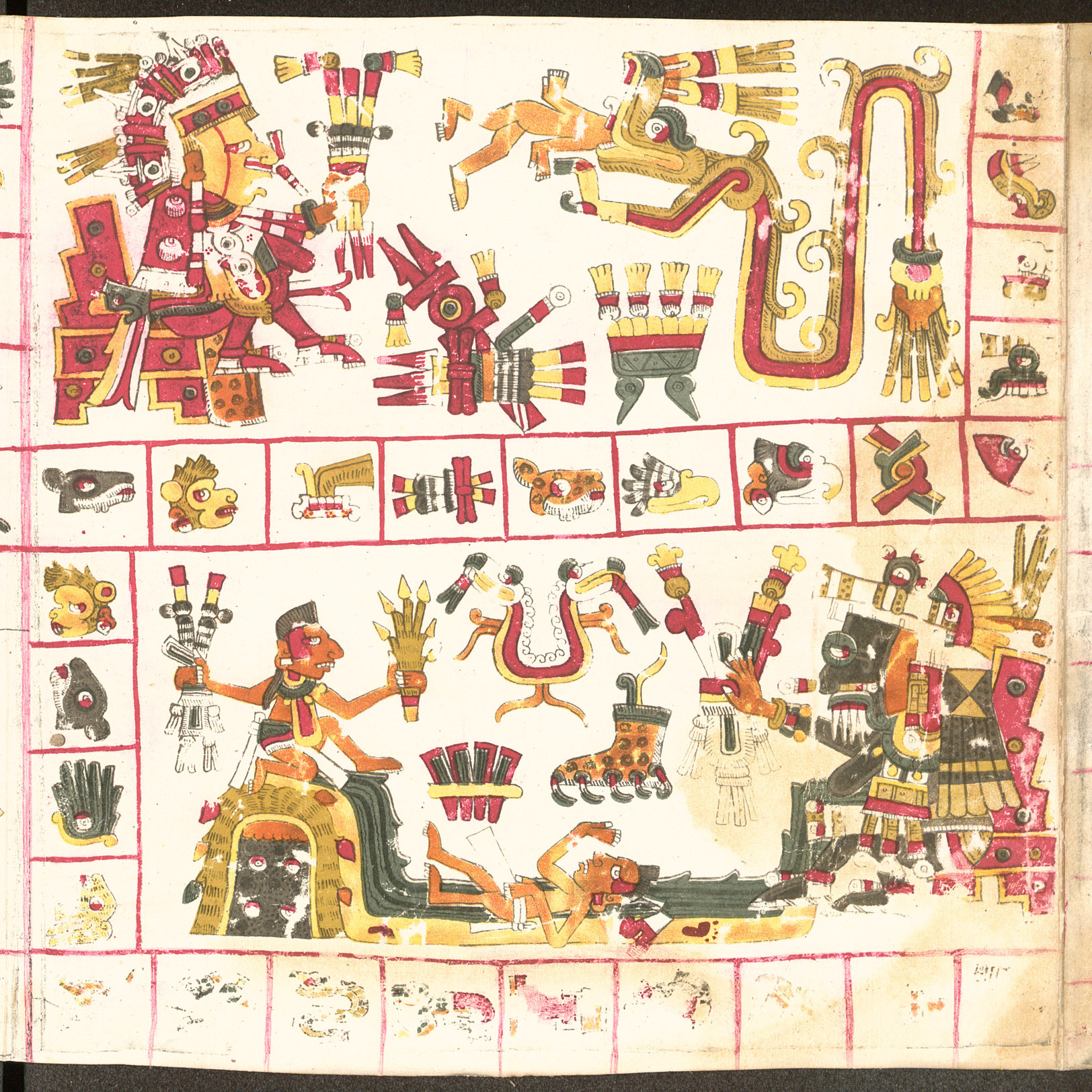
Page 67

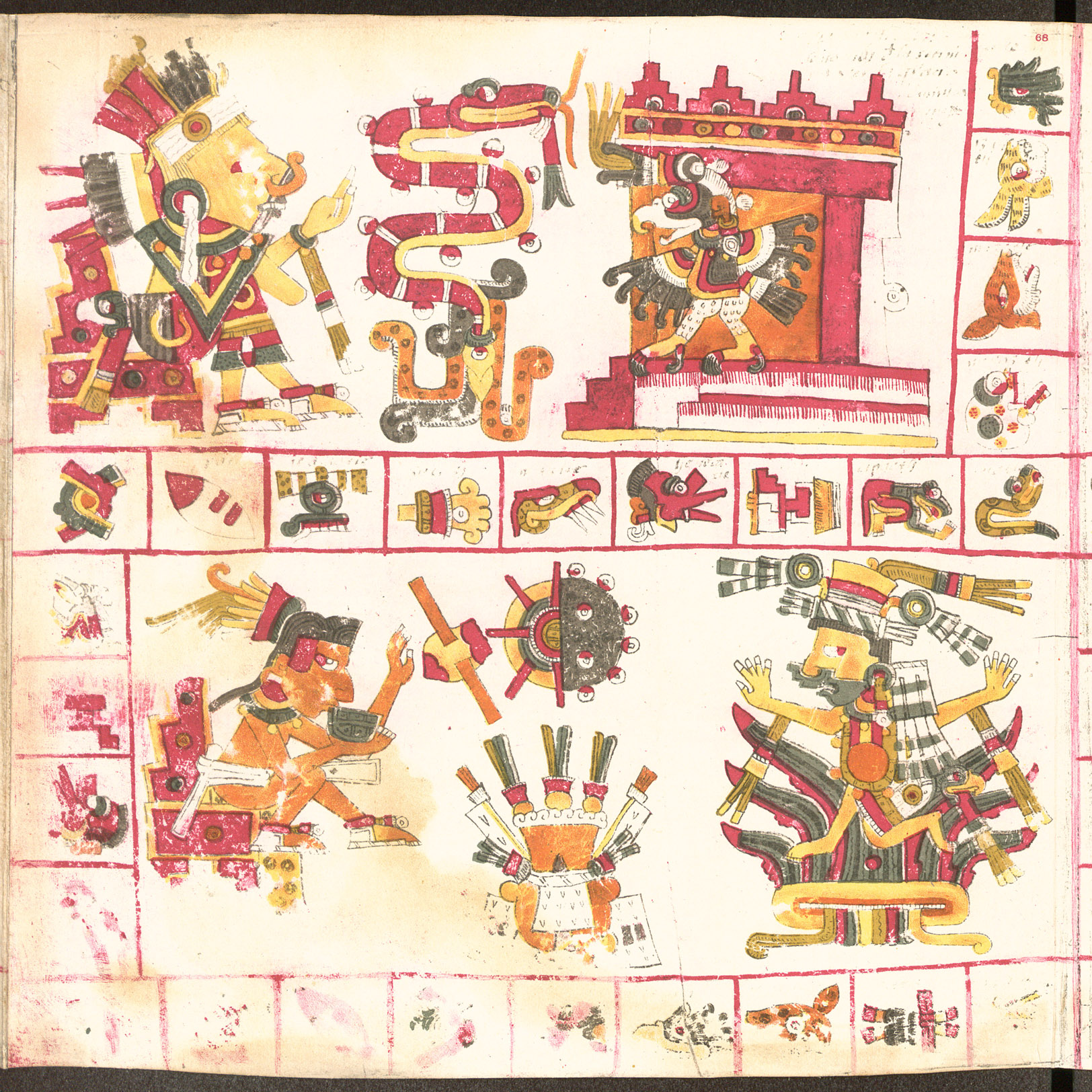
Page 68

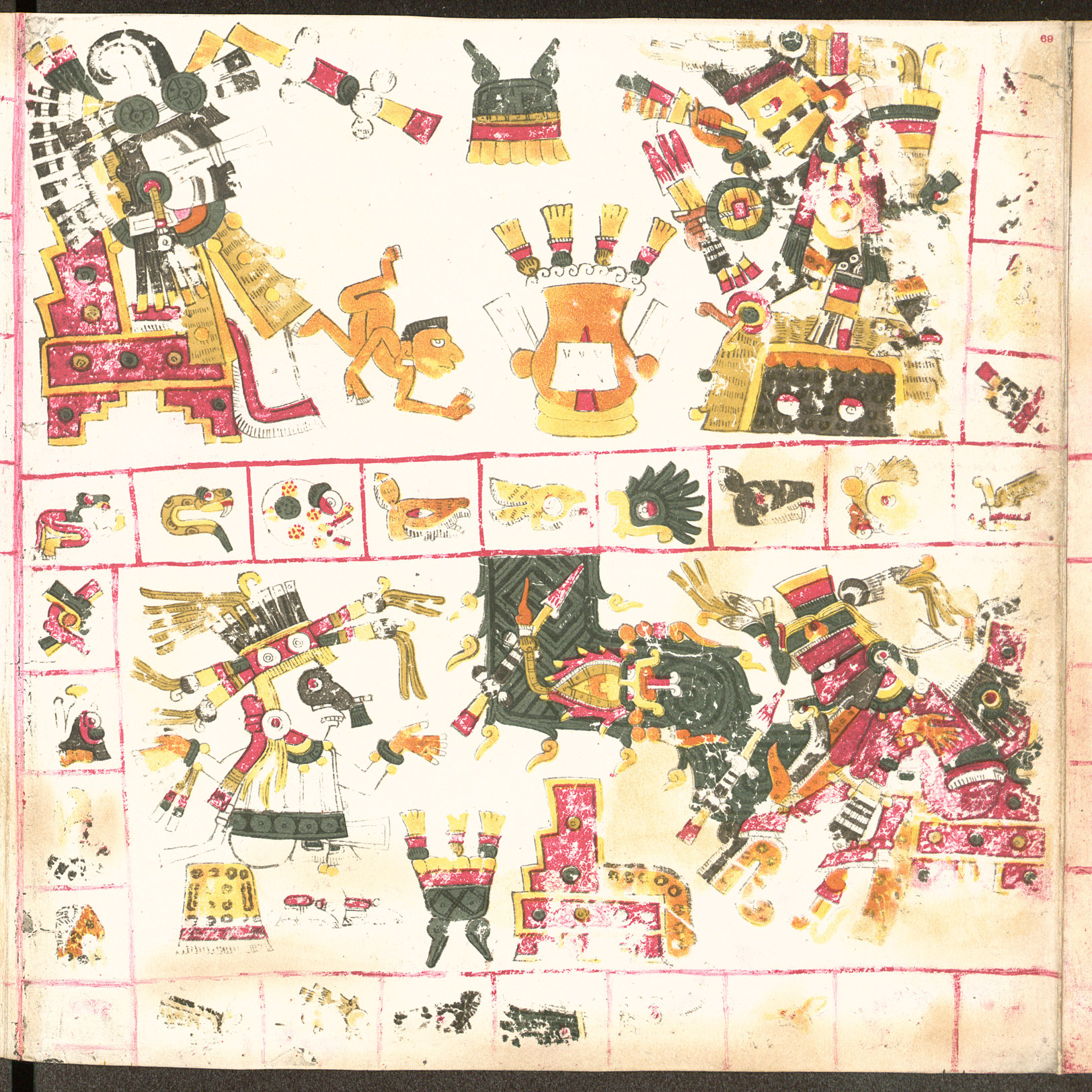
Page 69

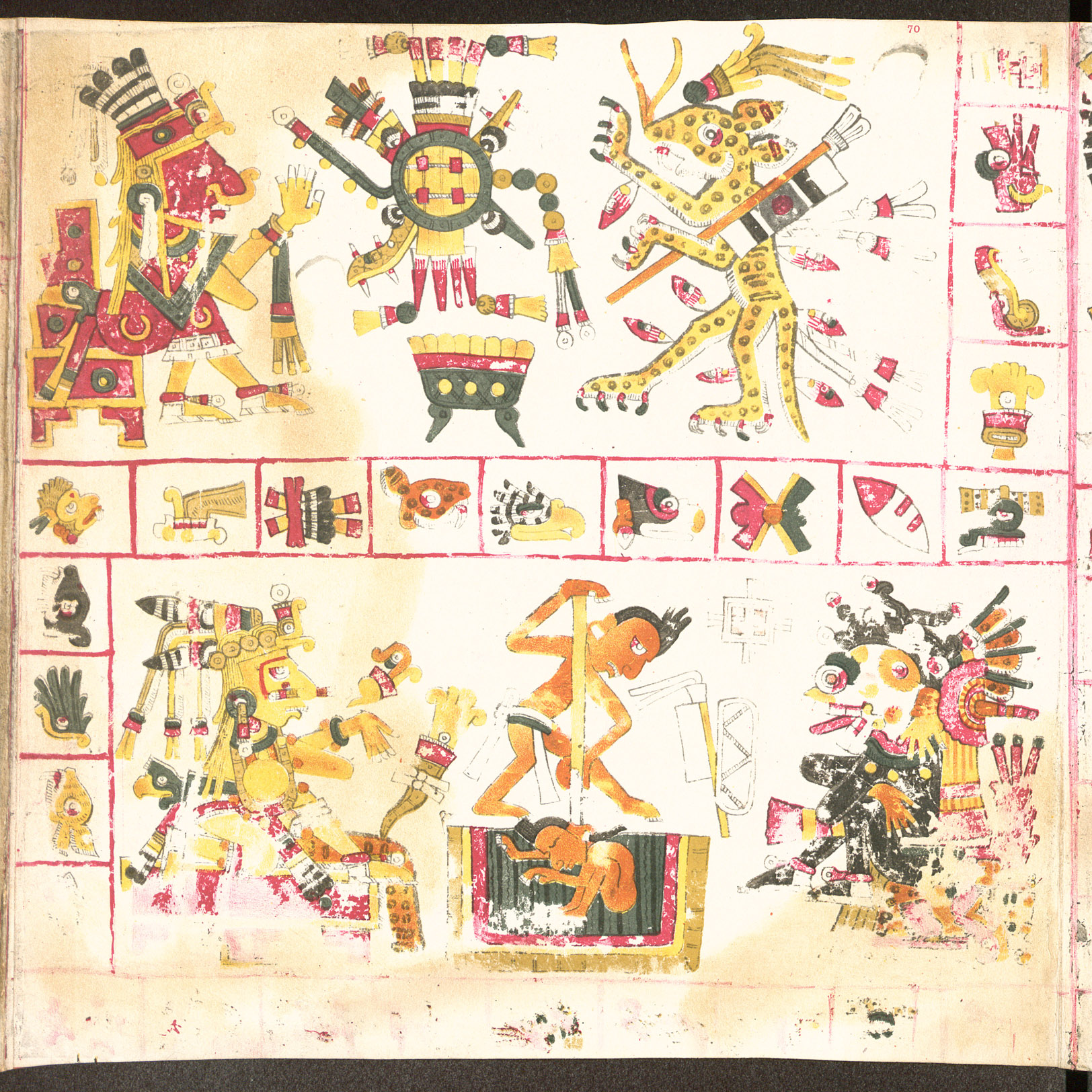
Page 70

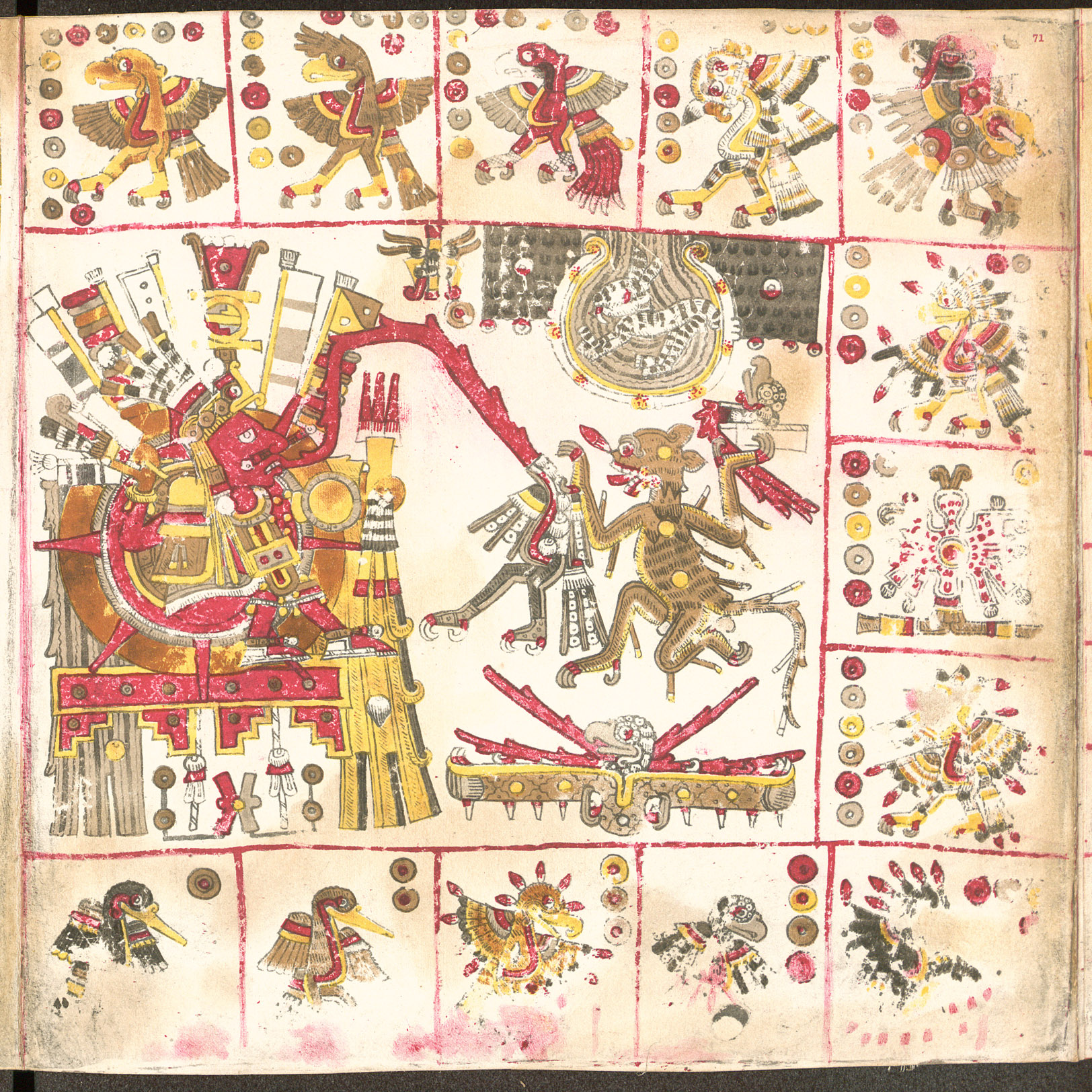

=== Section 25 The 20 'weeks', the quarters of the universe and the centre ===
This almanac divides the 20 day-signs into quarters associated with deities and snakes forming a xicalcoliuhqui or meandering pattern.

Image for page 72

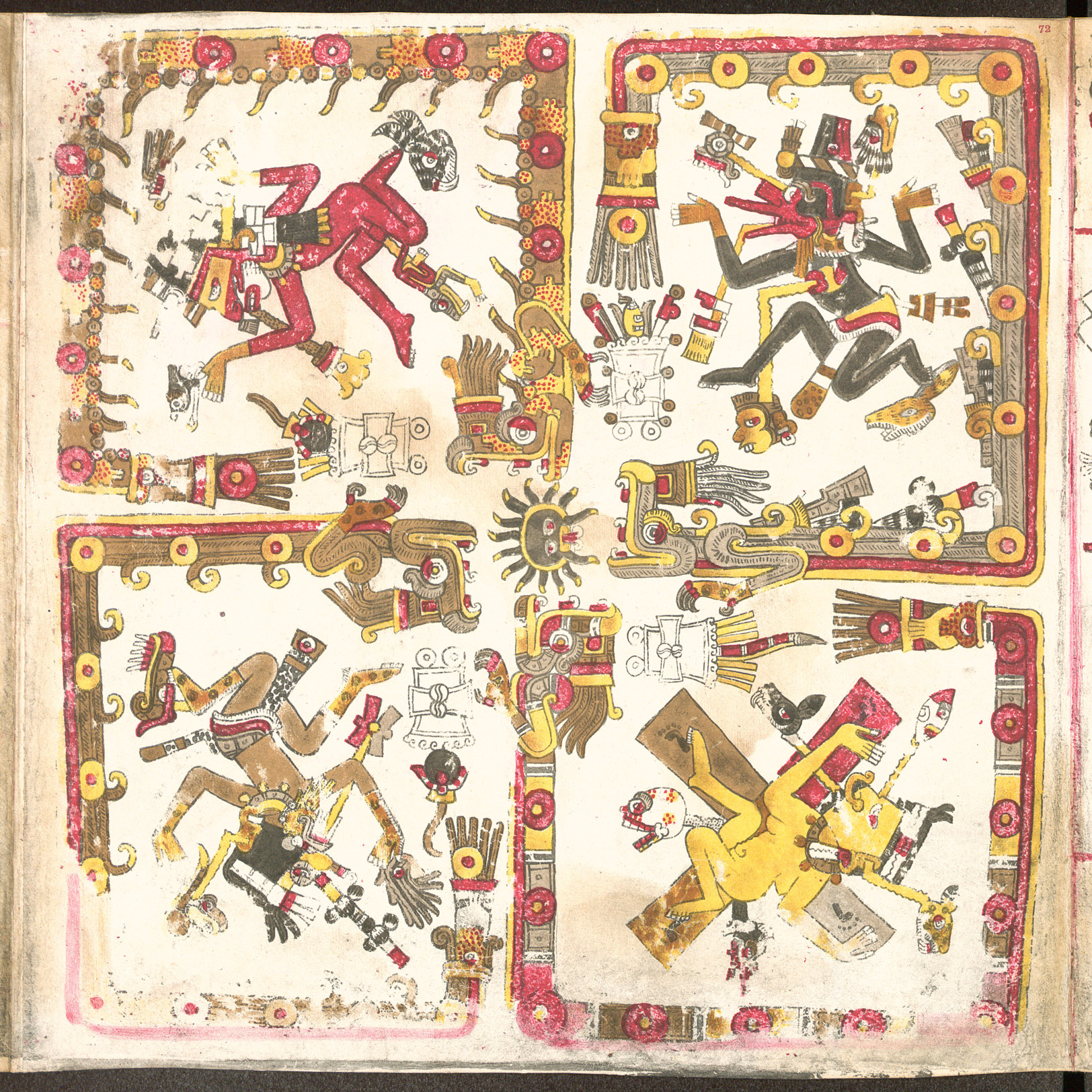

=== Section 26: 20 and 26 day-signs related to Quetzalcoatl and Mictlantecuhtli ===
Similar to section 20, but divided in four quarters rather than two halves.

Image for page 73

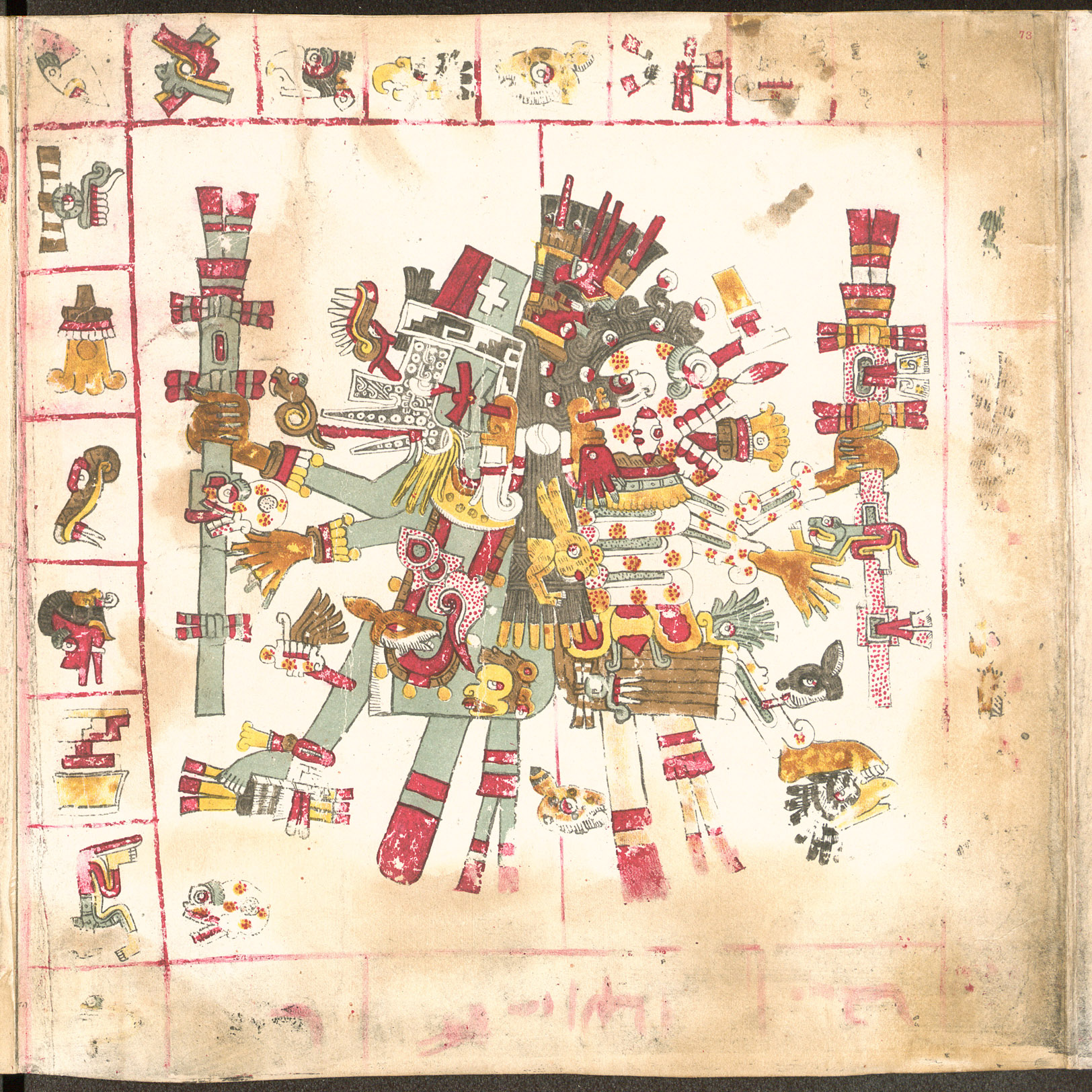

=== Section 27: 20-day signs referred to men and women ===
This almanac presents a Cihuapilli and a Macuiltonaleque, each associated with day-signs.

Image for page 74

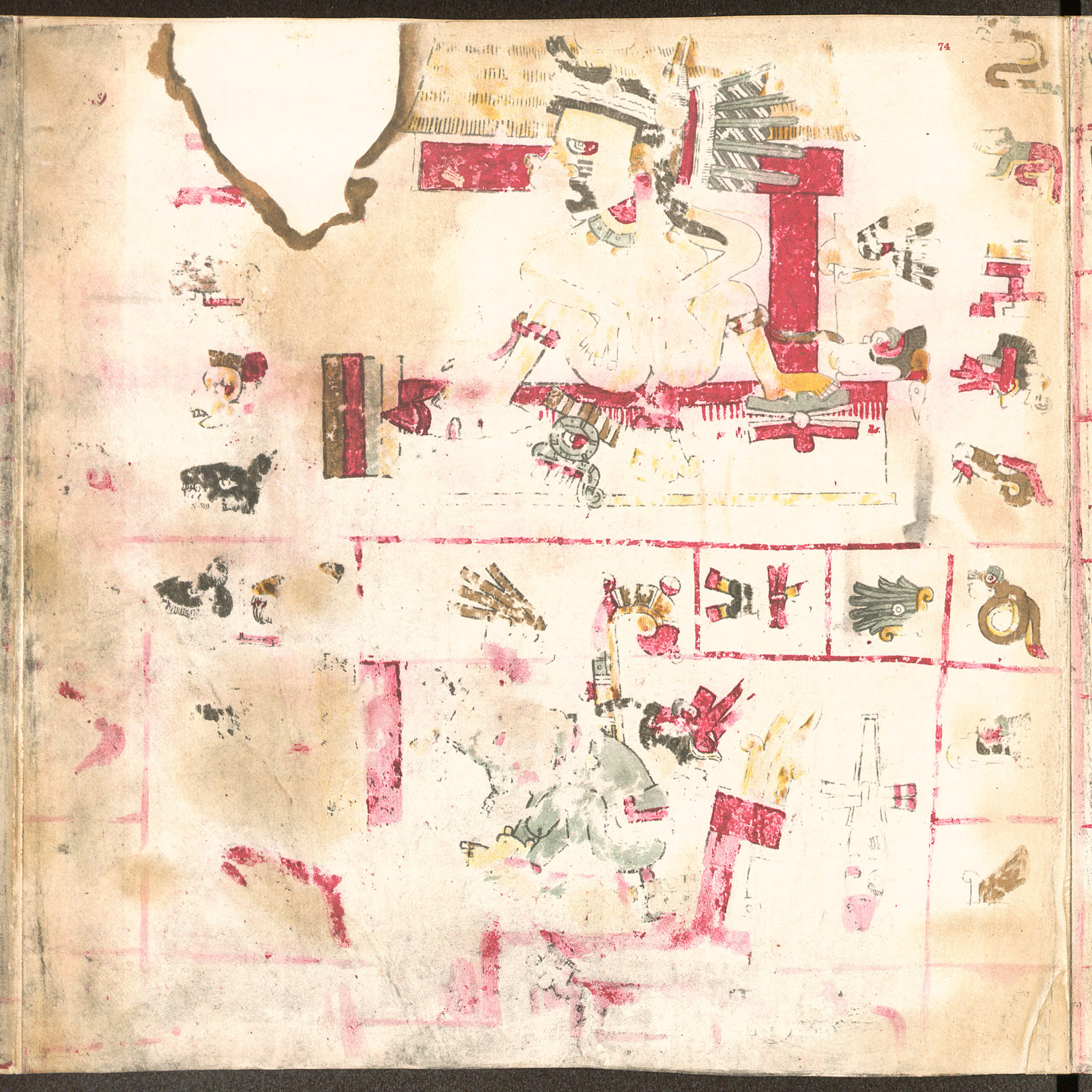

=== Section 28: Gods of the half-trecenas ===
This almanac depicts the ruling deities of half-trecena periods, enthroned, receiving cult and with associated mantic images.

Images for pages 75-76

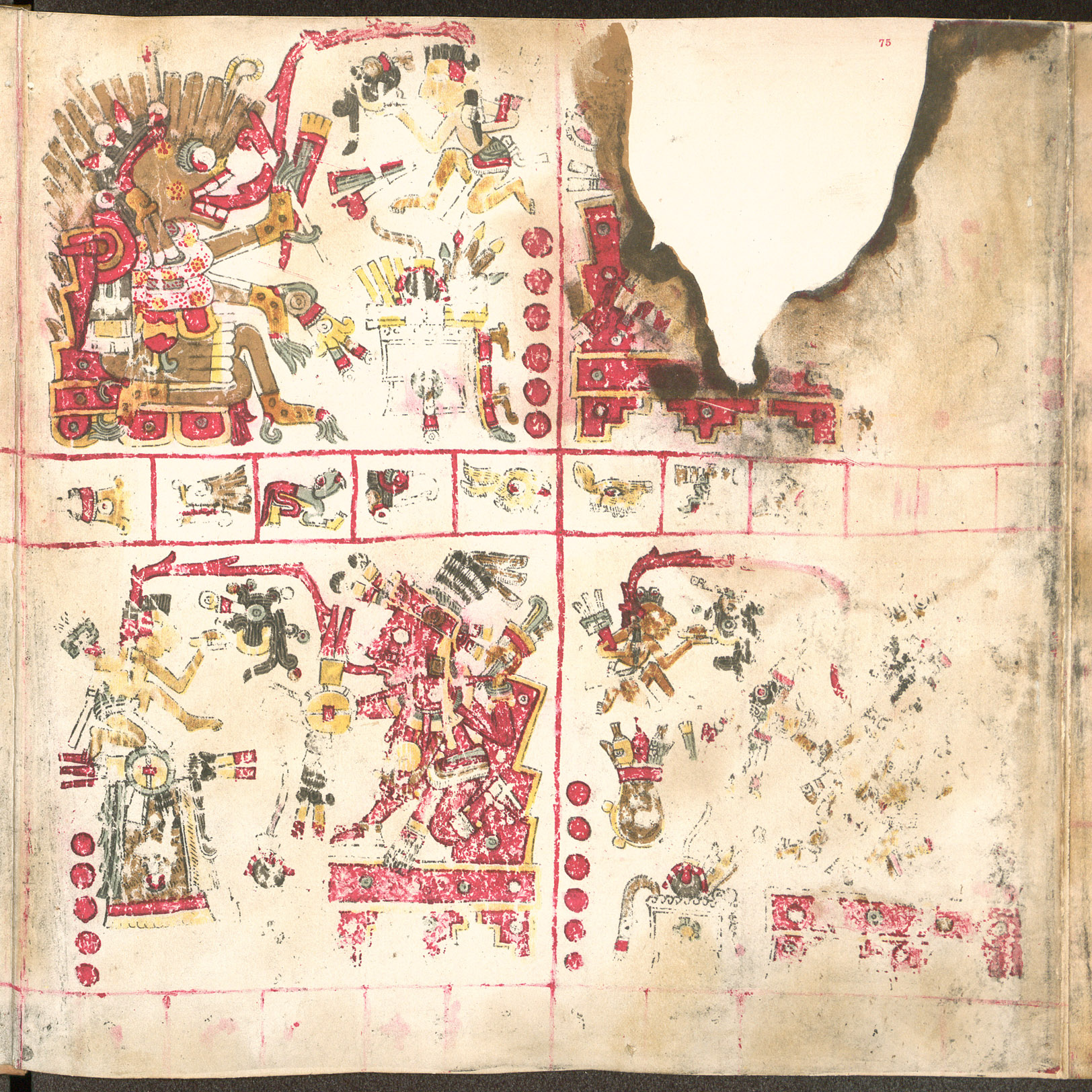

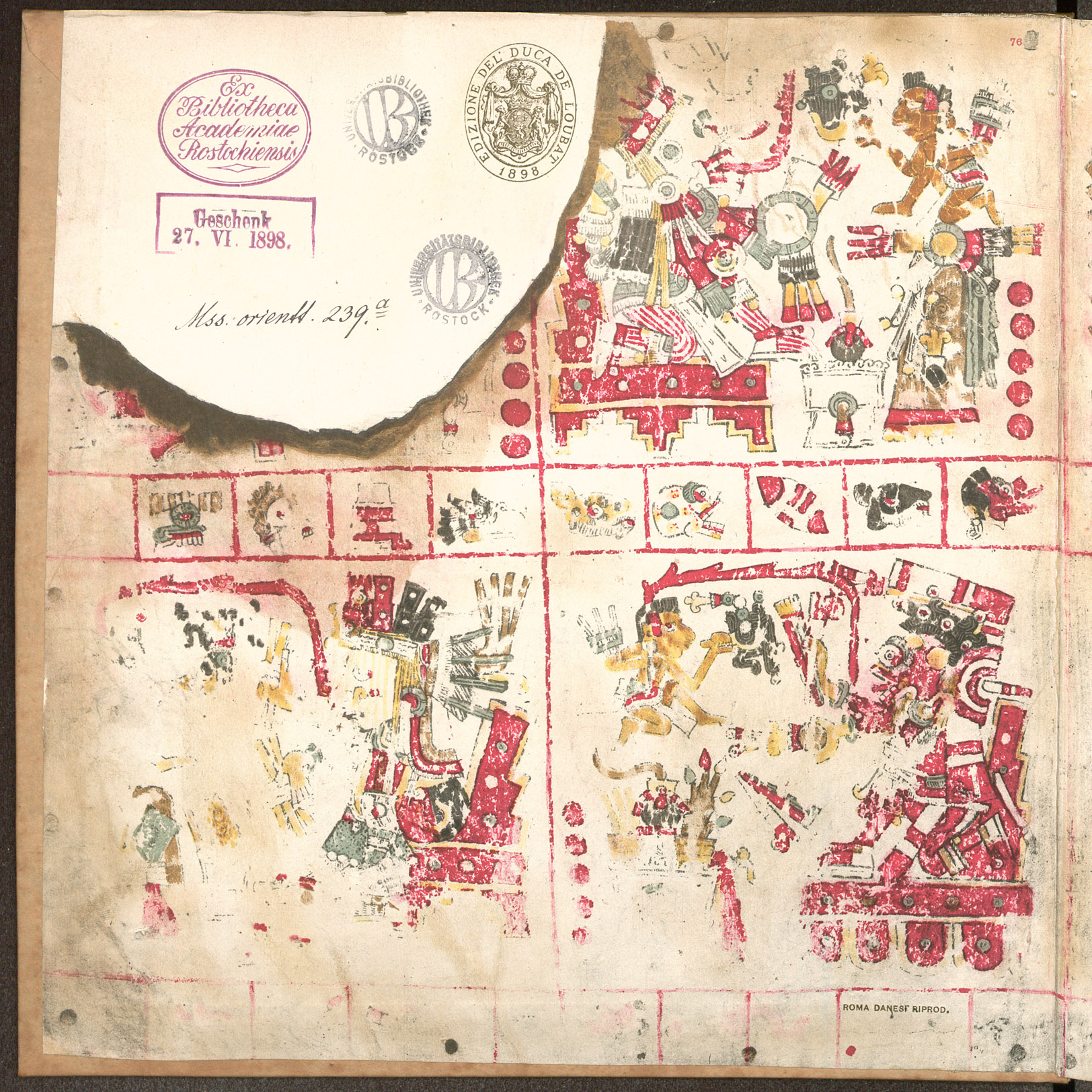
