= List of Aztec gods and supernatural beings =

This is a list of gods and supernatural beings from the Aztec culture, its religion and mythology. Many of these deities are sourced from Codexes (such as the Florentine Codex (Bernardino de Sahagún), the Codex Borgia (Stefano Borgia), and the informants). They are all divided into gods and goddesses, in sections. They also come from the Thirteen Heavens.

== Gods ==
=== Āhuiatēteoh ===
The Āhuiyatēteoh are five gods of excess and pleasure. The group made up of youthful solar deities of sensual and esthetic pursuits. who presided over flowers, feasting, singing, dancing, gaming, and painting and who bore the names of the five tonalpohualli (260-day religious divinatory calendar) days assigned to the south, with numerical coefficients of five (the number signifying ‘excess’).

- Mācuīlcōzcacuāuhtli, the god of gluttony.
- Mācuīlcuetzpalin
- Mācuīlmalīnalli
- Mācuīltōchtli, god of pulque and fertility; patron of featherworkers. The most prominent member.
- Mācuīlxōchitl, the god of gambling and music as well as an aspect of Xōchipilli.

=== Stars ===
- Centzonmīmixcōah, the 400 gods of the northern stars.
  - Cuahuitlīcac, one of the members of the Centzonmimixcoa. Cuahuitlicac was Coatlicue's son and Huitzilopochtli's brother. Cuahuitlicac warned the unborn Huitzilopochtli that Coatlicue's other 400 children were planning to kill her to prevent the birth of Huitzilopochtli. Cuahuitlicac is a god of the northern stars as part of the Centzonmimixcoa.
- Centzonhuitznāhuah, the 400 gods of the southern stars.
- Yoaltecuhtli, god of night or the night sun, thought to explain solar eclipse and or the personification of the Ocelotonatiuh (jaguar sun) i.e.: the first sun. An aspect of Tezcatlipoca.
- Ilhuicahua, god of heaven; the lord of heaven.

=== Medicine ===
- Pahtēcatl, god of healing and patron god of doctors and peyote. Patecatl is the Centzontotochtin's father.
- Īxtlīltōn, god of medicine and healing.

=== Centzontotochtin ===
The Centzontōtōchtin are the 400 gods of pulque.

- Ōmetōchtli, leader of the Centzontotochtin.
- Tēzcatzoncatl
- Tlīlhuah
- Tōltēcatl
- Tepoztēcatl
- Colhuatzincatl
- Mācuīltōchtli, god of pulque and fertility; patron of featherworkers.
- Totoltecatl, "He of Totollan (Place of the Turkey)."

=== Cinteteo ===
The Cinteteo are gods of the maizes associated with the Tiānquiztli.

- Iztacuhca-Cinteotl, god of the white maize.
- Tlatlauhca-Cinteotl, god of the red maize.
- Cozauhca-Cinteotl, god of the yellow maize.
- Yayauhca-Cinteotl, god of the black maize.
- Cinteotl, related god of maize

=== Fertility ===
- Cipactōnal, god of astrology and calendars associated with daytime.
- Huēhuehcoyōtl, god of uninhibited sexuality and deception. Huehuecoyotl is also the patron of wisdom, related to his tricks and foolishness.
- Huēhuehteōtl, god of old-age and origin

=== Ehēcatōtōntli ===
The Ehecatotontli are gods of the winds or breezes.

- Mictlampachecatl, god of the north wind.
- Cihuatecayotl, god of the west wind.
- Tlalocayotl, god of the east wind.
- Huitztlampaehecatl, god of the south wind.
- Ehēcatl, related god of wind. He blows the clouds with his breath to make them move in the first layer of the Thirteen Heavens.
- Quetzalcoatl-Ehecatl, the connection of wind and light.

=== Xiuhtōtōntli ===
The Xiuhtotontli are gods of fire and alternative manifestations or states of Xiuhtecuhtli.

- Xiuhiztacuhqui, god of the white fire.
- Xiuhtlatlauhqui, god of the red fire.
- Xiuhcozauhqui, god of the yellow fire.
- Xiuhxoxoauhqui, god of the blue fire.
- Chiconahui-Itzcuintli, god of the hearth and fire
- Xiuhtecuhtli, related god of fire and time. His face is painted with black and red pigment.
- Xiuhtecuhtli-Huehueteotl, the connection of old-age and time.

=== Underworld ===
- Mictlantecuhtli, god of Mictlan (the Underworld). He is also part of the Thirteen Heavens.
- Acolmiztli, god of Mictlan (the Underworld). He is a possible form of Mictlantecuhtli. Acolmiztli is also known as Acolnahuacatl.
- Techlotl, god who lived in one of nine layers of the underworld. This deity was associated with owls such as Chalchiuhtecolotl.
- Nextepehua, god of the ashes who lived in one of nine layers of the underworld. Nextepehua was Micapetlacalli's husband.
- Īxpoztequeh, god who lived in one of nine layers of the underworld. Iixpuzteque was Nexoxochi's husband.
- Tzontēmōc, god who lived in one of nine layers of the underworld. Tzontemoc was Chalmeccacihuatl's husband.
- Xolotl, god of death who is associated with Venus and the Evening Star. He is the twin god and a double of Quetzalcoatl.
- Cuāxolōtl, god who is assumed to be the female counterpart of Xolotl. Cuaxolotl appears to be a manifestation of Chāntico, although there seems to be some conflicting opinions.
- Tōnacātēuctli, god of sustenance associated with Ometecuhtli.
- Piltzintēuctli, god of the visions. In Aztec mythology, he is associated with Mercury (the planet that is visible just before sunrise or just after sunset) and healing.
- Citlalatonac, god of female stars in the Milky Way.
- Mixcōātl, god of hunting and old god of hurricanes and storms. Mixcoatl is associated with the Milky Way.
  - Amhimitl is Mixcoatl's harpoon (or dart), just like Xiuhcoatl is Huitzilopochtli's weapon.
- Tonatiuh, a god of the Sun. He is also part of the Thirteen Heavens.
- Nanauatzin, a god of the Sun. Nanauatzin sacrificed himself in a fire so that the Sun should continue to shine.
- Tēcciztēcatl, god who represents the male aspect of the Moon. Tecciztecatl is the son of Tlaloc and Chalchiuhtlicue.
- Tlahuizcalpantecuhtli, god of Venus' dawn and aspect of Quetzalcoatl. He has the longest name. He and Xolotl have Venus as association as symbol of twins.
- Xocotl, god of Venus and fire.
- Tlaclitonatio, god of underworld and light.

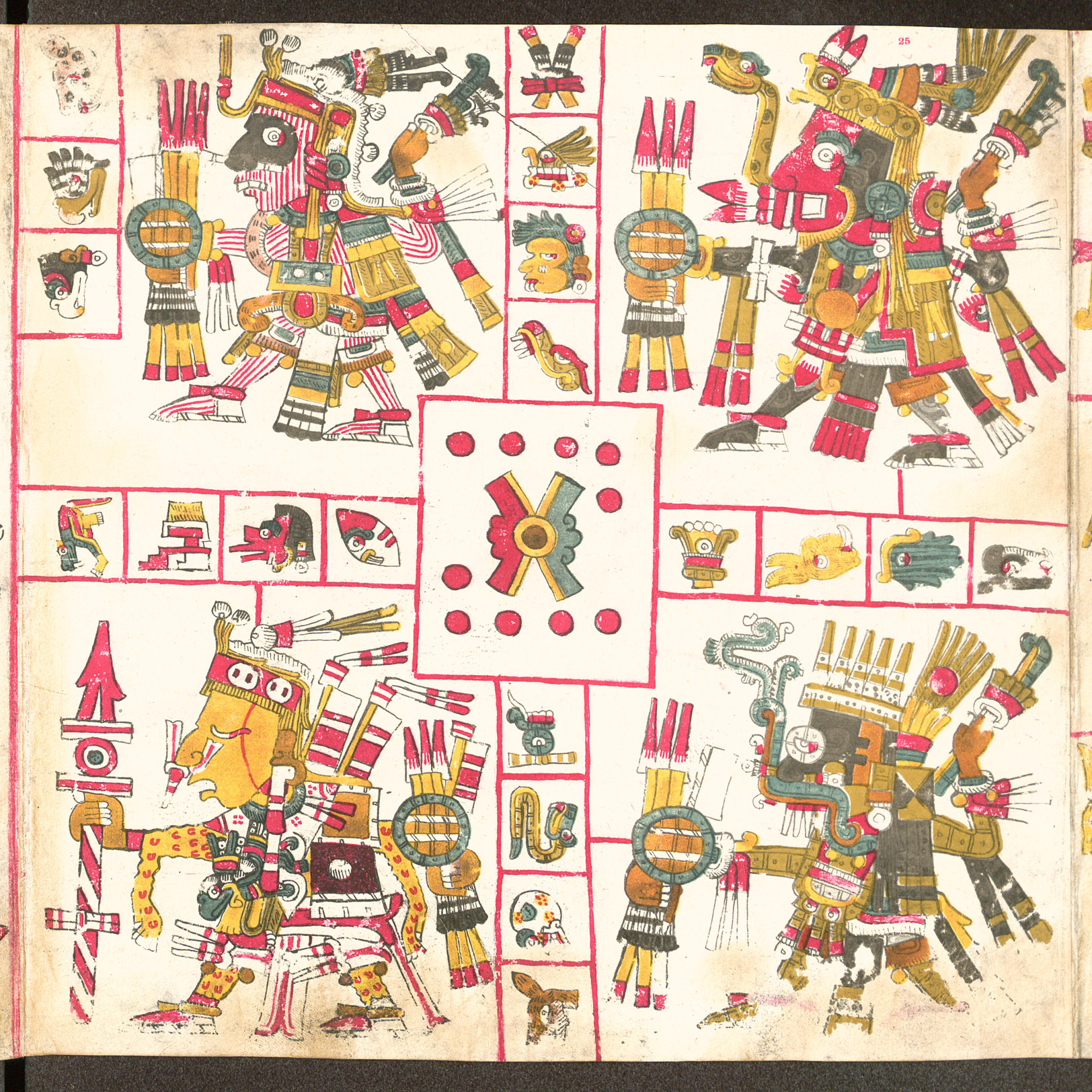
Patterns of War; (1a) Tlaloc, (1b) Xiuhtecuhtli, (2a) Mixcoatl, (2b) Xipe-Totec depicted in the Codex Borgia.

=== Four Tezcatlipocas ===
- Tēzcatlīpōca, creator god, lord of darkness, lord of the night, god of battles, and the lord of the North. Tezcatlipoca is also known as the "Smoking Mirror". Tezcatlipoca is the old arch-nemesis of Quetzalcōātl. (Black Tezcatlipoca)
- Quetzalcōātl, god of the life, the light and wisdom, lord of the winds and the day, and the lord of the West. Quetzalcoatl is the old arch-nemesis of Tezcatlipoca. Sometimes, Quetzalcoatl was the ruler of the East like Xipe-Totec. (White Tezcatlipoca)
- Xīpe Totēc, god of agriculture, fertility, seasons, metalsmiths, and disease, and the lord of the East. Xipe-Totec, once again, was the lord of the East, and Quetzalcōātl was the ruler of the West, but sometimes, they were the other way round and Xipe-Totec was the lord of the West. (Red Tezcatlipoca)
- Huītzilōpōchtli, god of war, human sacrifice, bloodletting, and the lord of the South. (Blue Tezcatlipoca)
- Payīnal or Pāinaltōn, god of battles and Huitzilopochtli's messenger.
- Tetzauhteotl, god of omens and wonder; a servant of Huitzilopochtli originally being a priest of Huitzilopochtli reborn into a god.
- Ixteocalle, a companion of Huitzilopochtli.
- Tepēyōllōtl, god of the animals, darkened caves, echoes, and earthquakes. Tepeyollotl is a variant of Tezcatlipoca and is associated with mountains.
- Itzcaque, god who represents Tezcatlipoca in his capacity of starting wars for his own amusement.
- Chālchiuhtōtolin, god of illness, disorder, and chaos. Chalchiuhtotolin absolves humans of guilt and overcomes their fate. He is also a manifestation of Tēzcatlīpōca.
- Ixquitecatl, god of sorcerers. Ixquitecatl is a possible variant of Tezcatlipoca.
- Itztlacoliuhqui-Ixquimilli, god of frost, ice, cold, winter, and punishment. Itztlacoliuhqui-Ixquimilli is also the god of objectivity and blindfolded justice. Itztlacoliuhqui-Ixquimilli is a variant of Tezcatlipoca and is associated with the night and the north.
- Macuiltotec, god of arsenal. Macuiltotec is mainly associated with weaponry and the rites of warfare. Macuiltotec is a possible variant of Tezcatlipoca.
- Telpochtli, god of young warriors; variant of Tezcatlipoca.
- Yoaltecuhtli, god of night or the night sun, thought to explain solar eclipse and or the personification of the Ocelotonatiuh (jaguar sun) i.e.: the first sun. An aspect of Tezcatlipoca.
- Tlatauhqui-Tezcatlipoca, god of metallurgy and metal working, the spirit of metal, brother of Yayauhqui-Tezcatlipoca. Aspect of Xipe Totec.
- Yayauhqui-Tezcatlipoca, god of obsidian and obsidian stone working, the spirit of obsidian, brother of Tlatauhqui-Tezcatlipoca. Aspect of Tezcatlipoca.
- Tlacochcalco-Yaotl, god of conquest and north; an aspect of Tezcatlipoca.
- Tloque-Nahuaque, creator god; an epithet of Tezcatlipoca or Ometeotl.

=== Ballgame ===
- Amapan, one of the deities of the Tlachtli ball court and one of the patron deities of the ballgame Ullamaliztli.
- Uappatzin, one of the deities of the Tlachtli ball court and one of the patron deities of the ballgame Ullamaliztli.

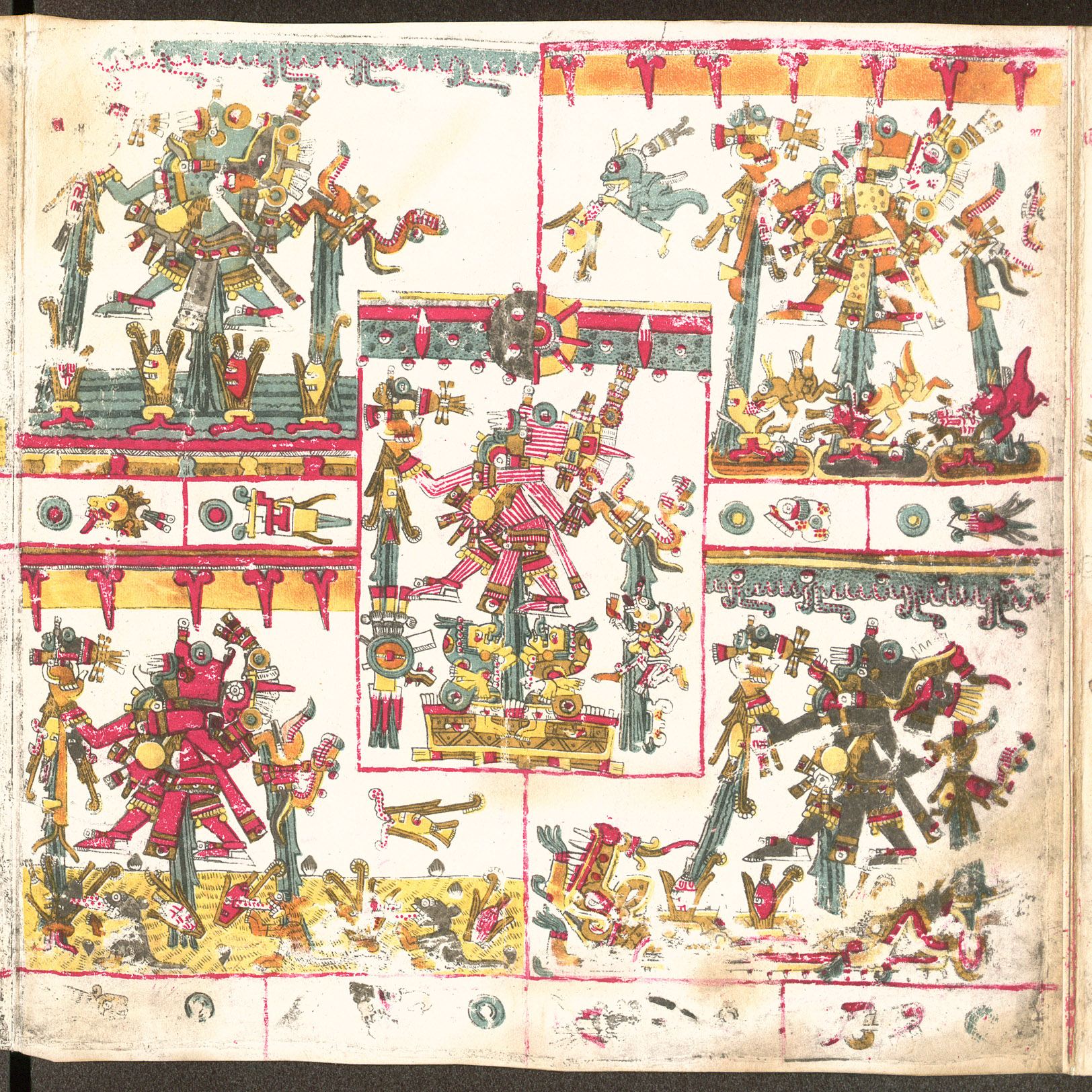
Five Tlaloquê depicted in the Codex Borgia.

=== Rain ===
- Tlāloc, god of rain, lightning, and thunder. Tlaloc is associated with fertility and agriculture. Tlaloc pierces the clouds' bellies to make them rain in the first layer of the Thirteen Heavens.
- Tlāloqueh, gods of rain, weather, and mountains. Tlaloc had also been considered the ruler of this motley group.
- Chalchiuhtlatonal, god of water who is related to the goddess Chalchiuhtlicue.
- Atlaua, god of water and protector of archers and fishermen. The Aztecs prayed to Atlaua when there were deaths in water.
- Ōpōchtli, god of fishing and birdcatchers. Apparently, Opochtli is the discoverer of both the harpoon and net.
- Nauhpa-Tecuhtli, a god of rain, and one of the Tlalocs, or water gods; he was favored by the petlachiuhque (mat-makers') guild, who credited him with having taught them to weave mats and make seats (icpalli); he was credited with making the reeds sprout and grow, and with making rain fall on people, washing them, bathing them. name meaning "Lord of The Four Directions"
- Ahuaque, deities associated with water; water possessors.
- Yauhqueme, "Owner of the Sweet-Scented Marigold Vestment;" one of the Tlaloque.

=== Sacrifice ===
- Itzpapalotltotec, god of sacrifice.
- Tecpatl/Itztapal-Totec/Itztli, god of sacrificial knives. an important deity in Teotitlan del Camino celebrated during the feast Tlacaxipehualiztli. The knife deity was clearly related to Xipe Totec, the god of flaying. This deity was known as the child of Cihuacoatl
- Teiztapali, an alternate form of Itztli.
- Teuhcatl, god of hunting
- Nezahualpilli, god of bloodletting.

=== Earth ===
- Tlaltecayoa, god who is associated with the round earth.
- Cipactli, crocodile god. His name means "crocodile" in Nahuatl. His name is similar to the god Cipactonal.
- Itztapaltotec, one of the patrons of the trecena and aspect of Xipe-Totec.
- Cinteotl, god of maize.
- Tepoztecatl, mythical hero and god of Tepoztlan
- Yoatzin, god of opposition.
- lalticpaque, possessor or master of the earth.
- Tozancol, god of gophers.

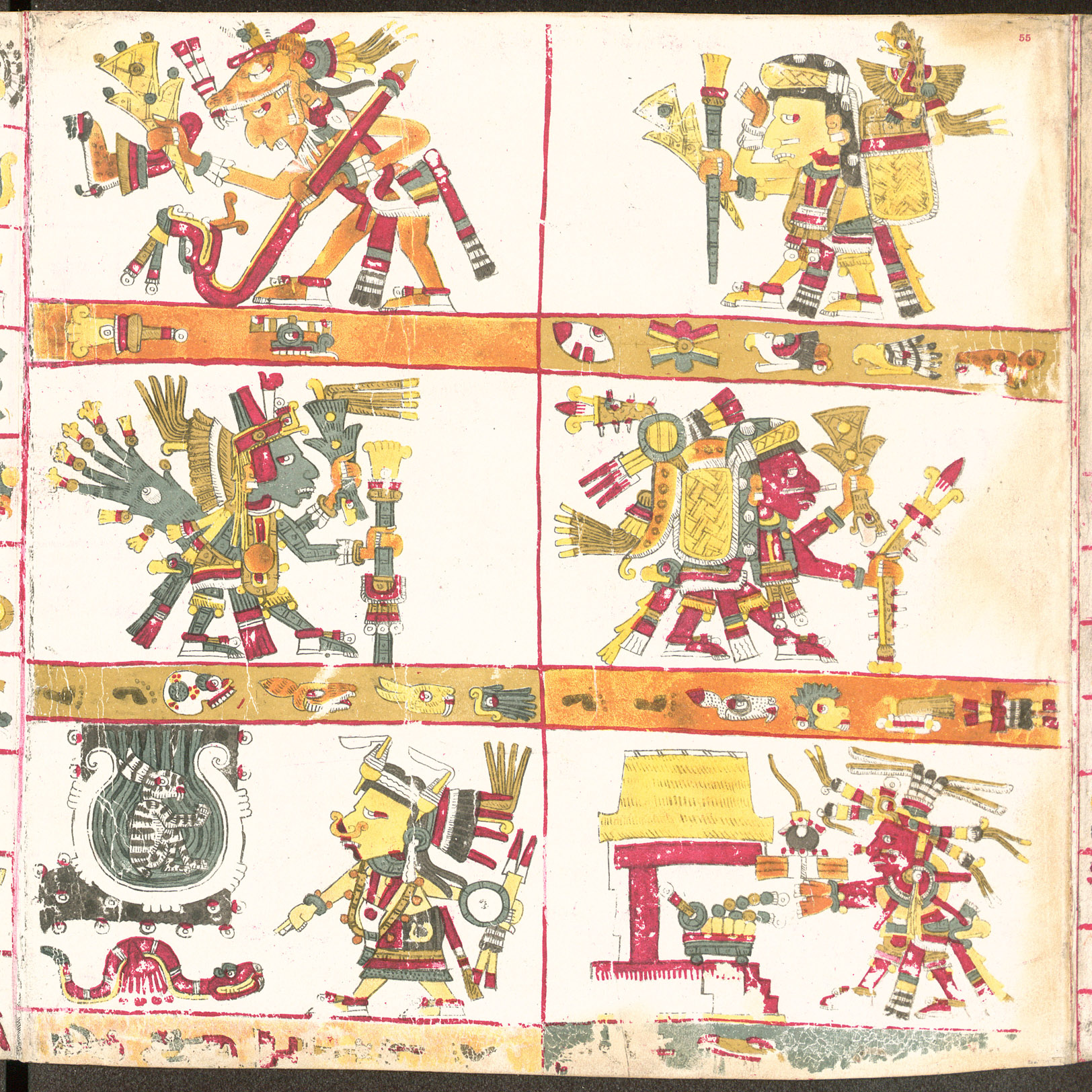
Patterns of Merchants; (1a) Huehuecoyotl, (1b) Zacatzontli, (2a) Yacatecuhtli, (2b) Tlacotzontli, (3a) Tlazolteotl, (3b) Tonatiuh depicted in the Codex Borgia.

=== Art ===
- Ppillimtec, god of music and poetry.
- Omacatl, god of feast and joy.
- Chicomexochtli, god of painters.
- Chiconahuiehecatl, a creator god similar to the Tezcatlipocas.
- Coyotlinahual, god of featherworkers.
- Xoaltecuhtli, god of dream.
- Xippilli, god of the verdant fields associated with summer.
- Xochipilli, god of love, art, games, beauty, dance, flowers, maize, fertility, and song.
- Quetzalpatzactli, god of featherworkers

=== Travel ===
- Yacatecuhtli, god of commerce and bartering and patron god of commerce and travellers, especially business travellers.
- Zacatzontli, god of roads. Zacatzontli can be a protector for merchants.
- Tlacotzontli, god of roads. Tlacotzontli can be a protector for merchants.
- Nappatecuhtli, patron god of mat-makers.
- Cochimetl, god of commerce, bartering, and merchants.

== Goddesses ==
=== Stars ===
- Coyolxāuhqui, goddess of the moon and leader of the Centzon Huitznahua.
- Cuetlāchcihuātl, goddess of the Centzon Mimixcoa.
- Tiānquiztli, goddesses of the Pleiades.
  - Citlaxoncuilli, goddess of Ursa Major.
  - Citlaltlachtli, goddess of Orion.
  - Citlalcolotl, goddess of Scorpius.
  - Citlalozomahtli, goddess of Cepheus, Ursa Minor, and Draco.
  - Citlalmiquiztli, goddess of Sagittarius and Corona Australis.
  - Citlalhuitzitzilin, goddess of Columba and Lepus.
  - Citlalmazatl, goddess of Eridanus and Fornax.
  - Citlalolli, goddess of Leo.
  - Citlalcuetzpalin, goddess of Andromeda and Pegasus…
  - Citlaltecpatl, goddess of Piscis Austrinus and Crane.
  - Citlalxonecuilli, goddess of Auriga and Perseus.
- Citlalicue, goddess of female stars in the Milky Way.
- Mētztli, goddess of the moon.

=== Medicine ===
- Mayahuel or Meyahualli, goddess of Agave. Mayahuel is also known as the "Woman of the 400 Breasts". She is the mother of the Centzontotochtin.

=== Fertility ===
- Oxomoco, goddess of astrology and calendars associated with nighttime.
- Cihuātēteōh, the spirits of women who died in childbirth. Cihuateteo were likened to the spirits of male warriors who died in violent conflict, because childbirth was conceptually equivalent to the battles of Aztec culture. They lurk in temples or lie in wait at crossroads and are ghastly to behold.
- Tzitzimītl (sg. / Tzitzimīmeh, pl.), female deities. As such related to fertility, Tzitzimimeh were associated with the Cihuateteo and other female deities such as Tlaltecuhtli, Coatlicue, Citlalicue, and Cihuacoatl. The leader of the Tzitzimimeh was the goddess Itzpapalotl who was the ruler of Tamoanchan.
- Cihuācōātl, goddess of childbirth and picker of souls.
- Coatlicue, goddess of fertility, life, death, and rebirth.
- Chimalma, goddess of fertility, life, death, and rebirth.
- Xochitlicue, goddess of fertility, life, death, and rebirth.
- Ītzpāpālōtl, death and sacrifice goddess, ruler of the Tzitzimimeh.
- Toci, goddess of healing. Toci has also been under the name of "Teteoinnan".
- Temazcalteci, goddess of maternity associated with Toci.
- Quilaztli, Aztec patron of midwives. Quilaztli is also known as Cōhuācihuātl (serpent woman), Cuāuhcihuātl (eagle woman) or Ocēlōcihuātl (jaguar woman), Pāpalōcihuātl (butterfly woman), Cihuāyāōtl (warrior woman), and Tzitzimīncihuātl (devil woman). These are individual honorary classes for women.
- Tonantzin, goddess who is called "our mother". She is a goddess that can also be any other names (e.g. Mother Earth).
- Tēteohīnnān, meaning "mother of gods," is another epithet for Tonantzin and many other goddesses.
- Chāntico, goddess of fires in the family hearth and volcanoes.
- Tzapotlantenan, goddess of fertility, inventor of pulque, and the "Mother of Zapotlan."
- Xōchiquetzal, goddess of fertility, beauty, and love.

=== Underworld ===
- Mictēcacihuātl, goddess of Mictlan (the Underworld). She is also part of the Thirteen Heavens.
- Miccāpetlācalli, goddess of the tomb who lived in one of nine layers of the underworld. Micapetlacalli was Nextepehua's wife.
- Nesoxochi, goddess of fear who lived in one of nine layers of the underworld. Nesoxochi was Iixpuzteque's wife.
- Chalmēccacihuātl, goddess who lived in one of nine layers of the underworld. Chalmeccacihuatl was Tzontemoc's wife.
- Omecihuatl, goddess of substance.
- Tonacacihuatl, goddess of sustenance associated with Omecihuatl.
- Tiyānquiztli, goddesses of the Pleiades.
  - Citlaxonecuilli, goddess of Ursa Major.
  - Citlāltlachtli, goddess of Orion.
  - Citlālcōlōtl, goddess of Scorpius.
  - Citlālozomahtli, goddess of Cepheus, Ursa Minor, and Draco.
  - Citlālmiquiztli, goddess of Sagittarius and Corona Australis.
  - Citlālhuitzītzilin, goddess of Columba and Lepus.
  - Citlālmazātl, goddess of Eridanus and Fornax.
  - Citlalolli, goddess of Leo.
  - Citlālcuetzpalin, goddess of Andromeda and Pegasus.
  - Citlāltecpatl, goddess of Piscis Austrinus and Crane.
  - Citlālxonecuilli, goddess of Auriga and Perseus.
- Citlalicue, goddess of female stars in the Milky Way.
- Mētztli, embodiment of the moon.
- Teoyaomiqui, an alternate name for Cihuacoatl when she gathers the souls of those who have died in battle, and the young mothers who died in childbirth

=== Sacrifice ===
- Itzpapalotlcihuatl, goddess of sacrifice.
- Chālchiuhtlīcuē, goddess of running water, lakes, rivers, seas, streams, horizontal waters, storms, and baptism.
- Acuecueyotl is Chalchiuhtlicue in disguise, but Acuecueyotl is also the god of rivers.
- Ātlatonān, patron goddess of those who are born with physical deformities or for unfortunate Mexica who suffered from open sores. This deity was also thought to be the cause of these ailments. She was impersonated by young virgins.
- Huīxtohcihuātl, goddess of salt and patron of cultivated foods (including people in the salt trade) who is also part of the Thirteen Heavens.
- Atlacoya, goddess of drought.
- Tzapotlāntenān, goddess of nature.

=== Earth ===
- Tlāltēuctli, is the old god/goddess of earth. (changed in the landscape and atmosphere)
- Tlalcihuatl, another name for old goddess of earth.
- Coatlicue, goddess of earth.
- Tlahzōlteōtl, goddess of lust, carnality, passions and sexual misdeeds that she gives to the Aztecs. Tlazolteotl also forgives them. She is part of the Thirteen Heavens where they are "as lunar phases".
- Ixcuiname, goddesses of carnality.
  - Tiyacapan, goddess of sexual passion.
  - Tēicuih, goddess of sexual appetite.
  - Tlahcoyēhua, goddess of sexual longing.
  - Xōcotl, goddess of sexual desire.
- Chicōmecōātl, goddess of agriculture.
- Xīlōnen, goddess of maize to where she has it and is tender due to the maize. Considered an aspect of Chicōmecōātl
- Chicome Xochitl, goddess of maize; the one who gave birth to maize.
- Yohualticitl, the goddess of the steam bath.

=== Art ===
- Ayauhteotl, the mysterious and unknown goddess of mist and haze. Ayautheotl is responsible for fame and vanity.
- Xōchiquetzal, goddess of fertility, beauty, sexual female power, protection of young mothers, pregnancy, childbirth, and women's crafts.
- Xōchitlīcuē, goddess of growthiness. Xochitlicue is the mother of the twins, Xochiquetzal and Xochipilli.

=== Travel ===
- Malīnalxōchitl, goddess or sorceress of snakes, scorpions and insects of the desert.
- Ilamatecuhtli, goddess of weavers and patron goddess of weaver guilds.

== See also ==
- Camaxtli, see Mixcoatl.
- Inaquizcaotl, see Huitzilopochtli.
- Acuecueyotlcihuatl, see Chalchiuhtlicue.
- Acolnahuacatlcihuatl, see Acolmiztli.
- Teteo, see Toci.
