= Ometochtli =

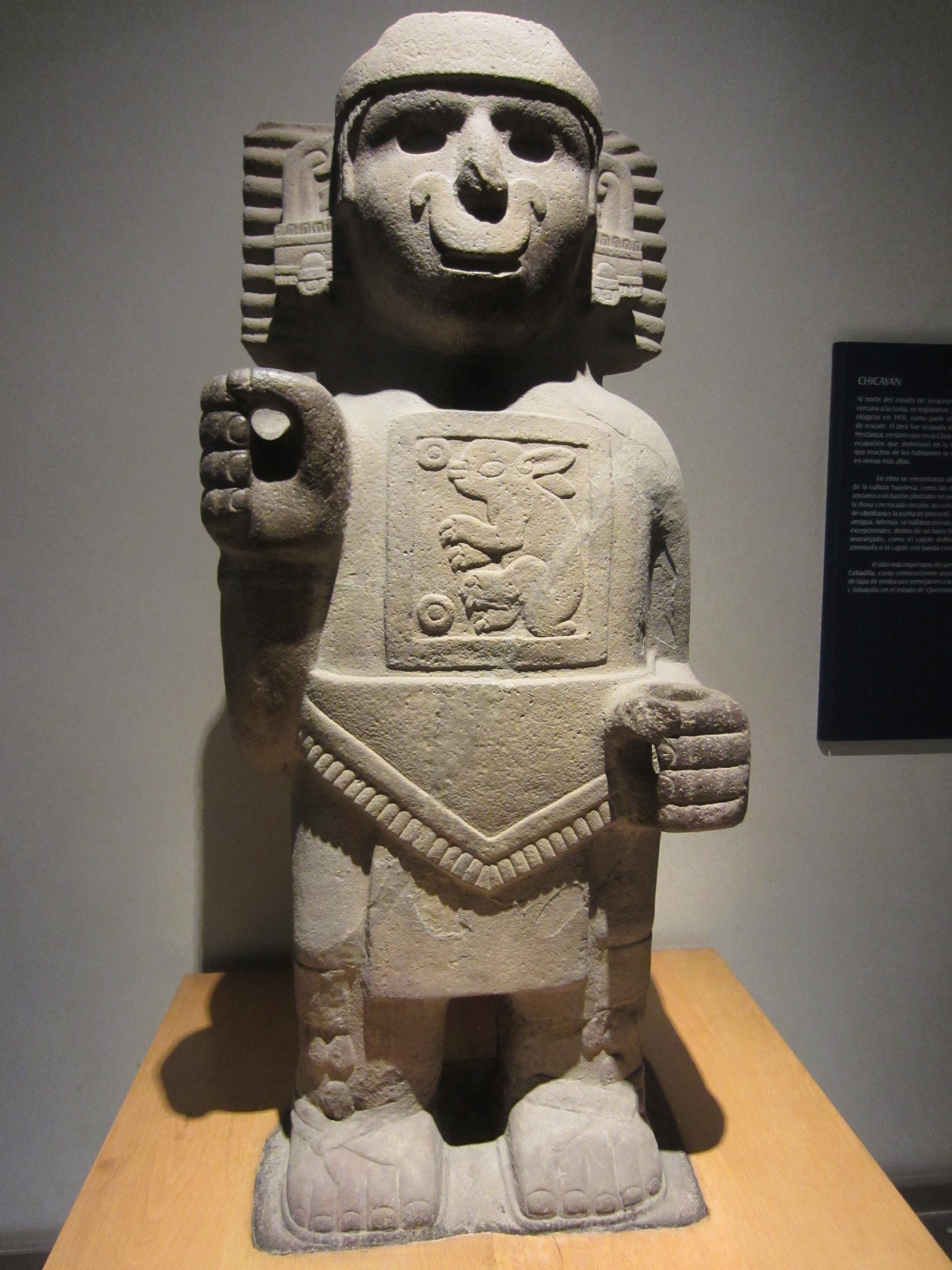
Huastec statue of Ometochtli.

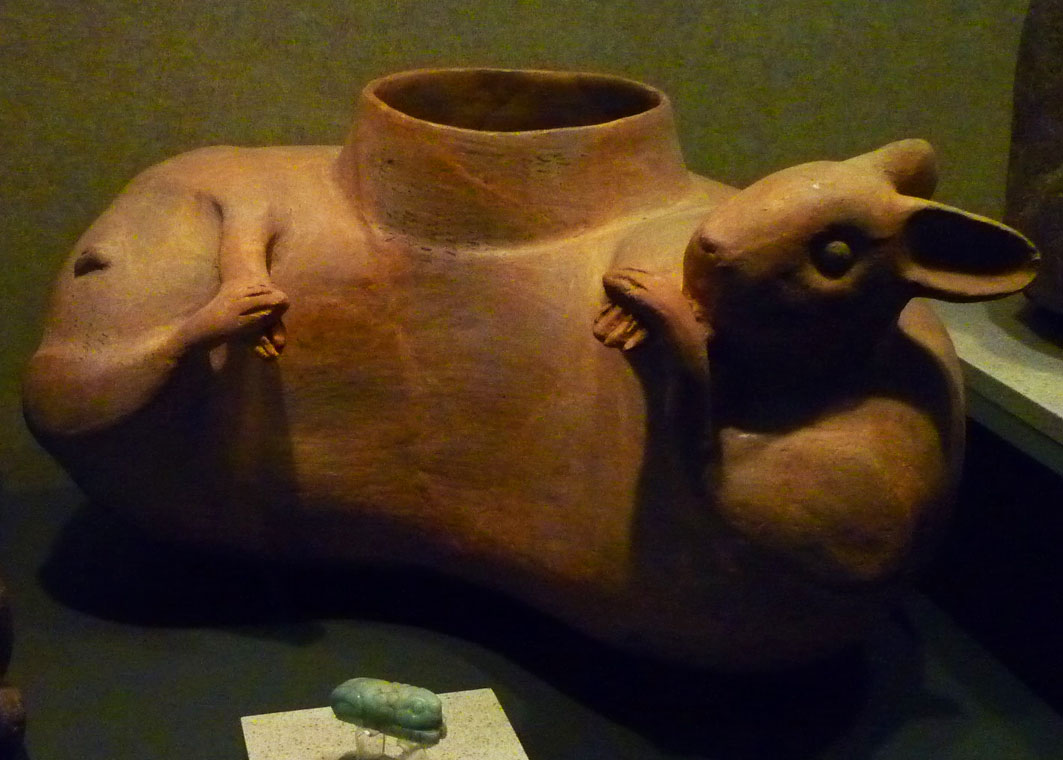
Rabbit-shaped vessel probably used for containing pulque; the rabbit, and the rabbit deity Ome Tochtli, was a symbol of pulque.

In Aztec mythology, Ometochtli (pronounced [oːmetoːtʃtɬi]) (Otomi: Noyo jwä) is the collective or generic name of various individual deities and supernatural figures associated with pulque (octli), an alcoholic beverage derived from the fermented sap of the maguey plant. By the Late Postclassic period of Mesoamerican chronology a collection of beliefs and religious practices had arisen in the context of the manufacture and ritualistic consumption of the beverage, known as the "pulque (or octli) cult" with probable origins in a mountainous region of central Mexico. In Aztec society octli rituals formed a major component of Aztec religion and observance, and there were numerous local deities and classes of sacerdotes ("priests") associated with it.

"Ometochtli" is a calendrical name in Classical Nahuatl, with the literal meaning of "two rabbit".

== See also ==
- Centzon Totochtin
- Macuil-Tochtli
- Mayahuel
- Tepoztecatl
