= Macuiltochtli =

Deity

Macuiltochtli (pronounced [makʷiɬtoːtʃtɬi], 'Five Rabbit'; from Classical Nahuatl: macuilli, 'five' + tochtli, 'rabbit') is one of the five deities from Aztec and other central Mexican pre-Columbian mythological traditions who, known collectively as the Ahuiateteo, symbolized excess, over-indulgence and the attendant punishments and consequences thereof.

Macuiltochtli and the other Ahuiateteo—Macuilxōchitl ('5 flower'), Macuilcuetzpalin ('5 lizard'), Macuilcozcacuahtli ('5 vulture'), and Macuilmalinalli ('5 grass')— bore the names of specific days in the tōnalpōhualli (Aztec/central Mexican version of the Mesoamerican 260-day calendar), where the day coefficient (trecena) of five had overtones associated with excess and loss of control. Postclassic central Mexican traditions identified rabbits with the beverage pulque and insobriety, and by extension Macuiltochtli had a particular association with inebriation and excessive consumption.

Macuiltochtli was also part of the Centzon Tōtōchtin, the four hundred rabbits which were all gods of drunkenness.

== See also ==
- Aztec mythology
- Mayahuel, foremost of the Pulque Gods
- Ometochtli, Two Rabbit, master of the Centzon Tōtōchtin
- Tepoztēcatl, a Pulque god associated with Tepoztlán
