= Tlilhua =

Aztec Deity

In Aztec mythology, Tlīlhua (Nahuatl:[ˈt͡ɬiːl.wa], lit."one that has ink") is one of the Centzontotochtin, the gods of pulque.
