= Tepoztēcatl =

Deity in Aztec myth

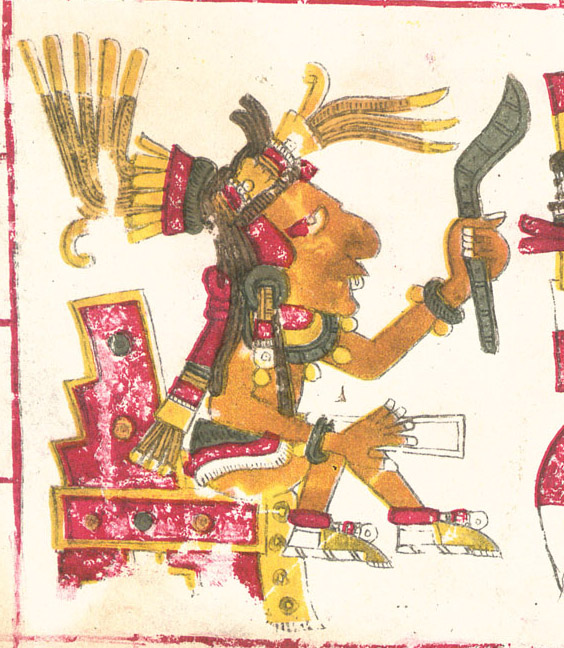
- Tepoztēcatl, described in the Codex Borgia
- Gender: male
- Consort: Mayahuel

In Aztec mythology, Tepoztēcatl [teposˈteːkat͡ɬ] (from tepoztli "workable metal" [teˈpost͡ɬi] and tēcatl "person" [ˈteːkat͡ɬ] ) or Tēzcatzontēcatl [teːskat͡sonˈteːkat͡ɬ] (from tēzcatl [teːskat͡ɬ] "mirror", tzontli "four hundred" [ˈt͡sont͡ɬi] and tēcatl "person" [ˈteːkat͡ɬ]) was the god of pulque, of drunkenness and fertility. The deity was also known by his calendrical name, Ometochtli ("two-rabbit"). He is a consort of Mayahuel, who is a mask-avatar of Xōchiquetzal.

According to Aztec myth, Tepoztēcatl was one of the Centzon Tōtōchtin, the four hundred children of Mayahuel, the goddess of the maguey plant, and Patecatl, the god that discovered the fermentation process. As a deity of pulque, Tepoztēcatl was associated with fertility cults and Tlāloc. Tepoztēcatl was also associated with the wind, hence deriving an alternative name of Ehecacone, son of the wind.

Tepoztēcatl appears in the Mendoza Codex carrying a copper axe.

El Tepozteco, in the Mexican state of Morelos, is an archaeological site named after the deity. The site was a sacred place for pilgrims from as far as Chiapas and Guatemala. This site has a small pyramid built on a platform, with a combined height of 9.5 metres (31 ft), located on a mountain overlooking the town of Tepoztlán.
