= Yacatecuhtli =

Aztec Deity

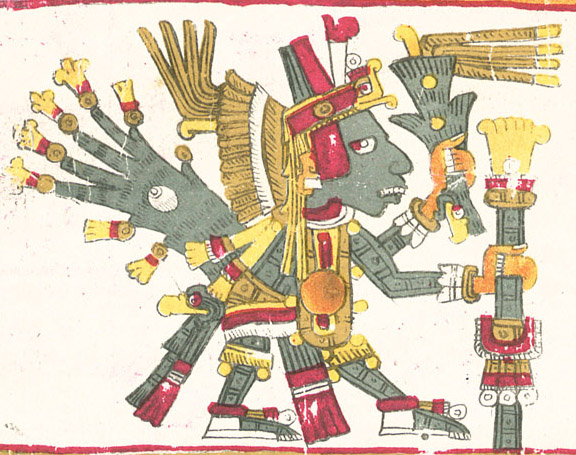
A drawing of Yacatecuhtli in the Codex Borgia

In Aztec mythology, Yacatecuhtli ([jakaˈtekʷt͡ɬi]) was a patron god of commerce and travelers, especially business travelers. His symbol is a bundle of sticks. Merchants would carry a cane as they moved from village to village peddling their wares, and at night-time would tie them together into a neat bundle before sprinkling them with blood from their ears. It was believed that this ritual in Yacatecuhtli's honor would guarantee success in future business ventures, not to mention protection from vicious beasts and robbers on their journeys.

His name means "lord of the nose" (Nahuatl yacatl, nose and tecuhtli, lord), or more figuratively "lord of the vanguard," as a vanguard goes ahead of the main body similar to how a nose is always in front of one’s body.
