= Painal =

Nahuatl word

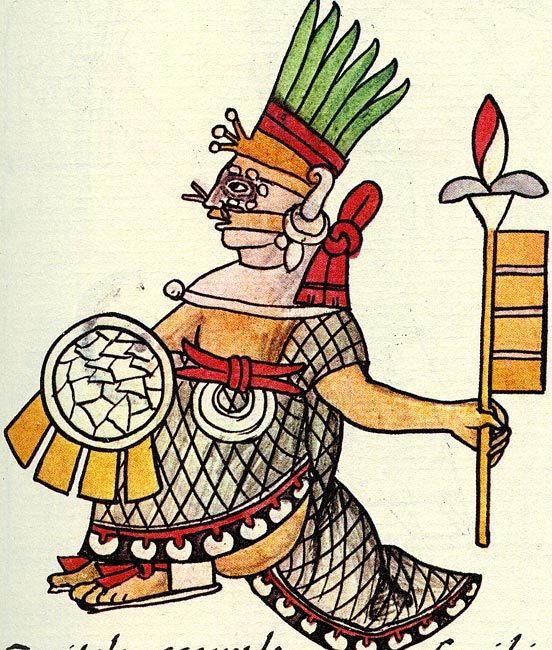
Painal as depicted in the Florentine Codex.

In Aztec religion, Painal (also spelled Paynal or Painalton, "Little Painal"; also spelled Paynalton; Classical Nahuatl: Payīnal [paˈjiːnaɬ], Payīnaltōn, Payīnaltzin) was sometimes interpreted by Spanish colonists as a god (teotl) who served as a representative of Huitzilopochtli. Other scholars have noted that Paynala may have been a toponym, confused for a person.

Bernardo de Sahagún's General History of the Things of New Spain, commonly called the Florentine Codex, briefly describes Painal thus:

Paynal was "the delegate," "the substitute," "the deputy," because he represented Uitzilopchtli. When there was a procession he was given the name Paynal, because they pressed him on quickly; he was made to hasten.

— Bernardino de Sahagún, Florentine Codex
