= Tlacotzontli =

Aztec Deity

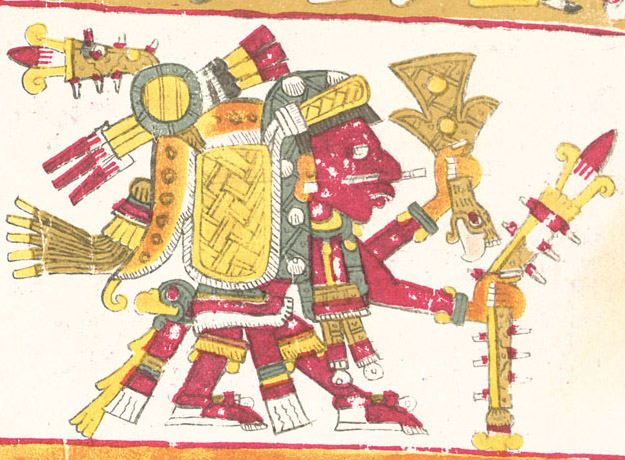
Tlacotzontli

Tlacotzontli is an Aztec god of roads. He was also the protector of roads to the native Mexicans.

To please the god many travelers would cut themselves among roads. Paper banners cover in blood and rubber were also made as an offering to this god.
