= Cintēteo =

Aztec gods of maize

In Aztec mythology, the Cintēteo (Nahuatl pronunciation: [sinteːˈteoʔ]) are the four gods of maize. They are sons of the goddess Centeōtl and the god Cinteōtl.

Their names are:

- Iztāc-Cinteōtl (meaning white corn)
- Tlatlauhca-Cinteōtl (meaning red corn)
- Cozauhca-Cinteōtl (meaning yellow corn)
- Yayauhca-Cinteōtl (meaning black corn)
