= Itztlacoliuhqui =

Aztec god

- frost
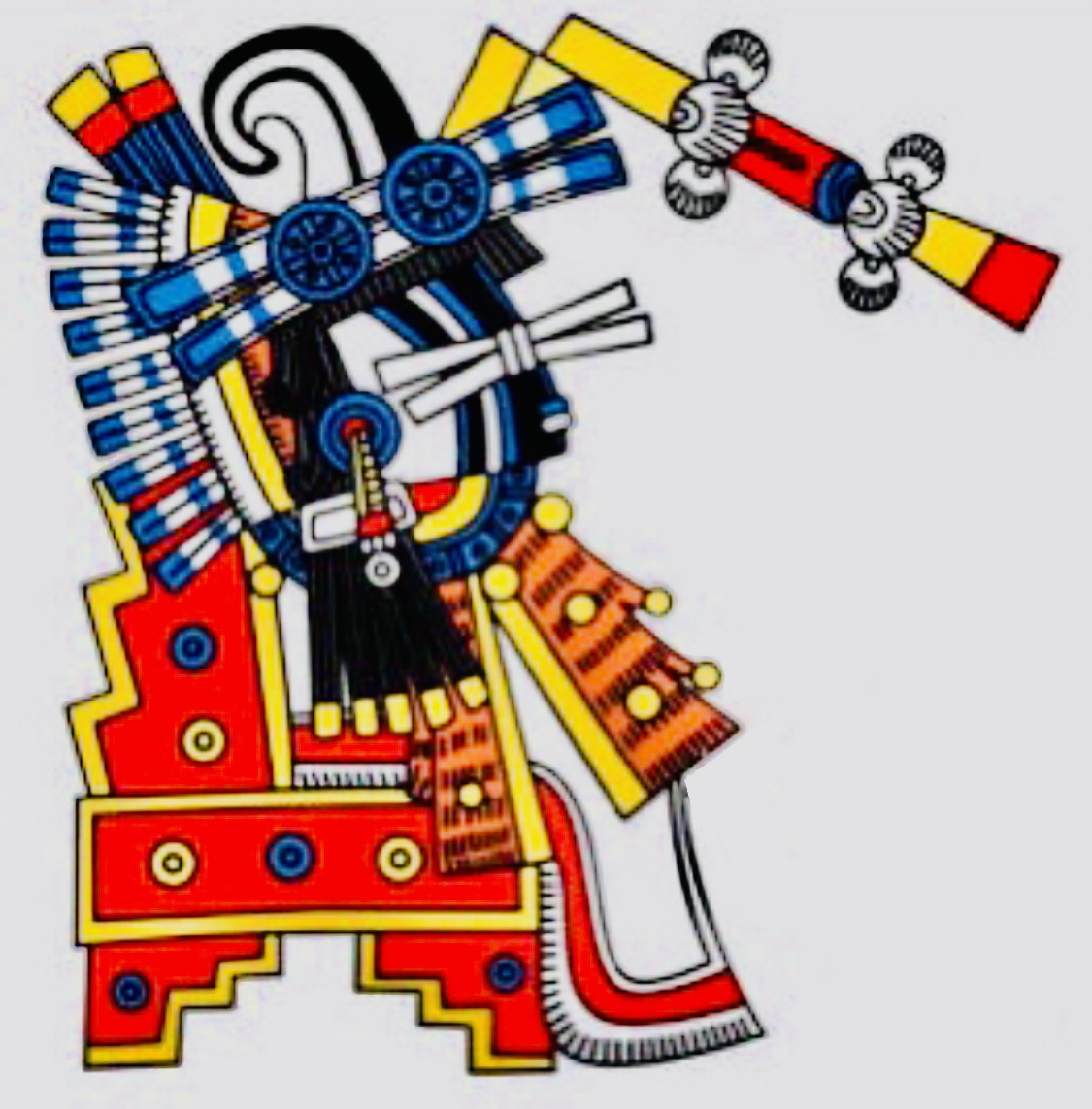
- Itztlacoliuhqui in the Codex Borgia
- Gender: male

In Aztec mythology, Itztlacoliuhqui [i:t͡st͡ɬako:'liʍki] is the god of frost. He also represents matter in its lifeless state.

The Nahuatl name Itztlacoliuhqui is usually translated into English as "curved obsidian blade". J. Richard Andrews contends that this is a mistranslation and that the correct interpretation is "everything has become bent by means of coldness" or "plant-killer-frost".

In the Aztec calendar, Itztlacoliuhqui is the lord of the thirteen days from 1 Lizard to 13 Vulture. The preceding thirteen days are ruled over by Patecatl and the following thirteen by Tlazolteotl.

The creation of this god appeared in the Aztec myth of creation. Tonatiuh, the sun god, demanded obedience and sacrifice from the other gods before he will move. Enraged at his arrogance, the god of dawn and the planet Venus, Tlahuizcalpantecuhtli, shoots an arrow at the sun. However, the dart misses its mark and the sun throws his own back at the morning star, piercing the Lord of Dawn through the head. At this moment, Tlahuizcalpantecuhtli is transformed into the god of obsidian stone and coldness, Itztlacoliuhqui.

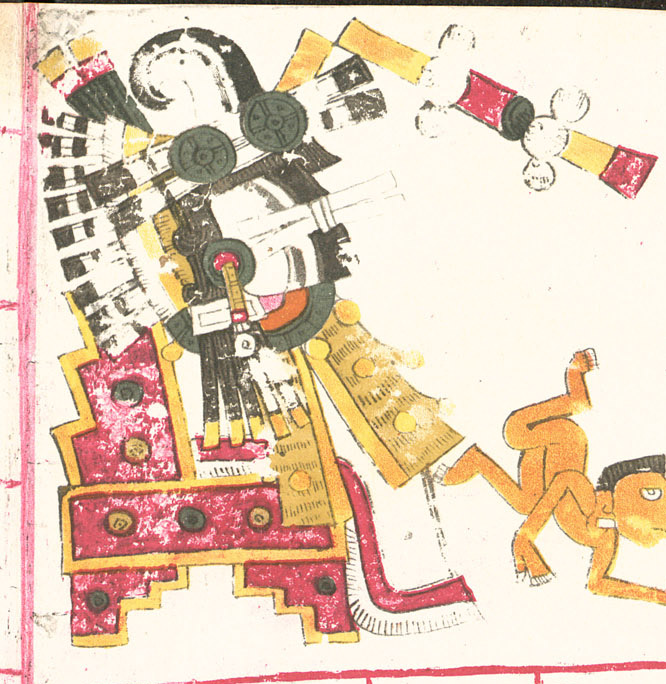
Itztlacoliuhqui in the Codex Borgia

Itztlacoliuhqui's iconography depicts a straw broom (tlachpānōni) in his hand, symbolizing the function of this wintry death deity as the cleaner of the way for new life to emerge thereafter.

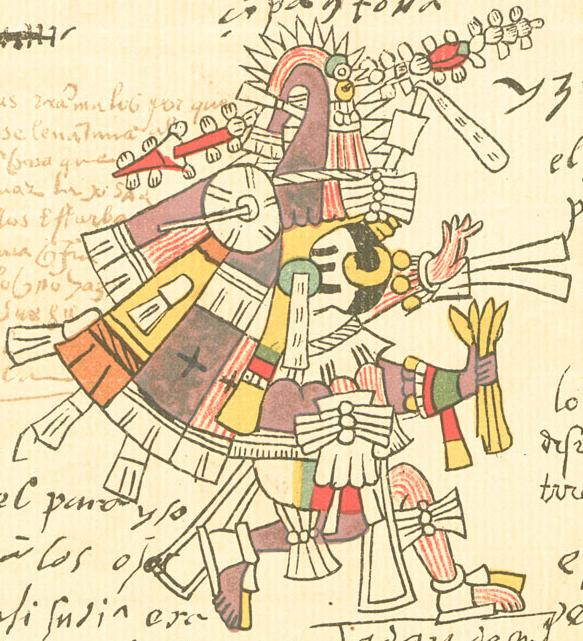
Itztlacoliuhqui in the Codex Telleriano-Remensis

== See also ==
- Deities and personifications of seasons
- List of death deities
