= Chalchiuhtecolotl =

Aztec deity

Chalchiuhtecolotl was a night owl god from Aztec mythology. His name means "precious owl."
