= Patecatl =

Aztec god of healing, fertility, and pulque

- God of pulque, lord of healing and fertility
- Member of the Nauhtzonteteo
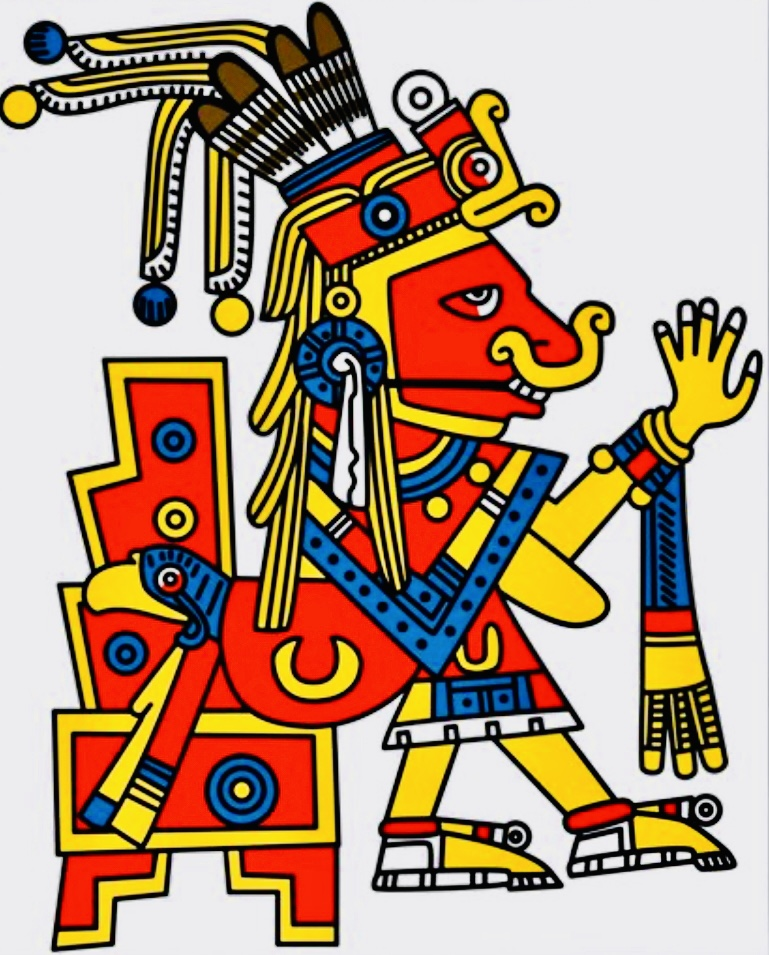
- Patecatl as depicted in the Codex Borgia
- Abode: the volcano Popocatépetl
- Gender: Male
- Region: Mesoamerica
- Ethnic group: Aztec (Nahua)

Genealogy
- Parents: Omecihuatl (Emerged by Tecpatl)
- Siblings: the Nauhtzonteteo (1,600 gods)
- Consort: Mayahuel
- Children: Centzon Tōtōchtin (400 rabbits)

In Aztec mythology, Patecatl is a god of healing and fertility and the discoverer of peyote as well as the "lord of the root of pulque". With Mayahuel, he was the father of the Centzon Totochtin.

In the Aztec calendar, Patecatl is the lord of the thirteen days from 1 Monkey to 13 House. The preceding thirteen days are ruled over by Mictlantecuhtli and the following thirteen by Itztlacoliuhqui.
