= Ixtlilton =

Aztec god of medicine and healing

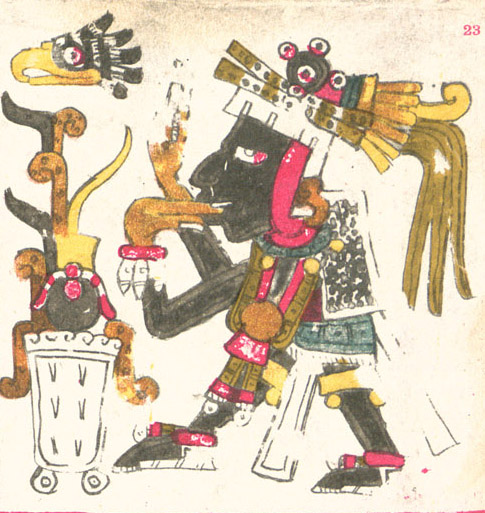
- Ixtlilton
- Gender: male

Ixtlilton (Nahuatl languages: Īxtlīltōn pronounced [iːʃˈt͡ɬiːɬtoːn],"ink at the face", from īxtli, "face", "eye", tlīlli, "black ink", and -tōn, diminutive suffix) in Aztec mythology is a god of medicine and healing and therefore was often alluded to as the brother of Macuilxochitl, the god of well-being or good luck. Ixtlilton was a gentle god, who emanated from an obsidian mask which brought darkness and peaceful sleep to children in their beds at night.
