= Centzon Tōtōchtin =

Group of divine rabbits in Aztec mythology

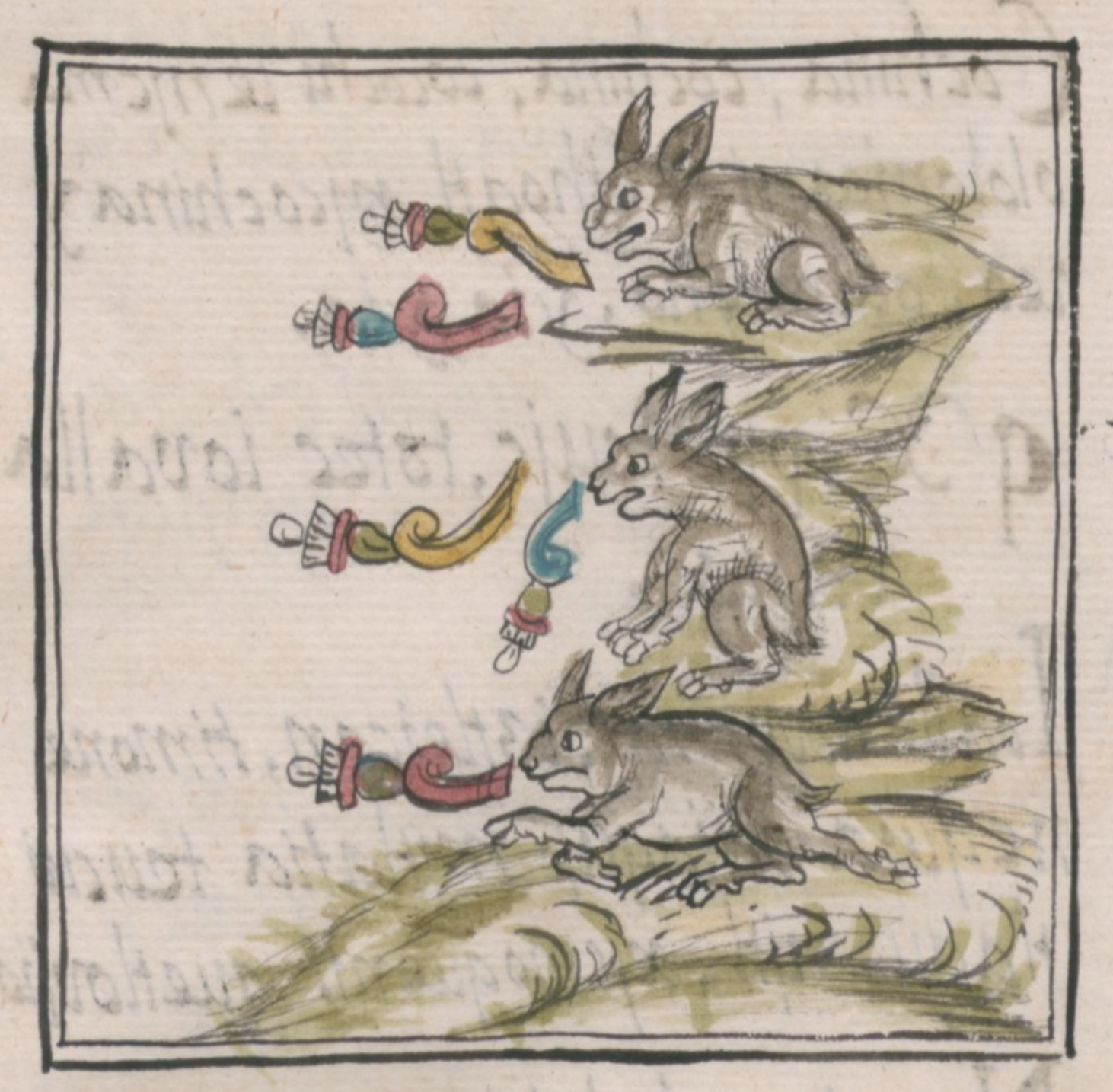
Possible depiction of the Centzon Tōtōchtin in the Florentine Codex

In Mexica mythology, the Centzon Tōtōchtin (Nahuatl pronunciation: [sent͡son toːˈtoːt͡ʃtin] "four-hundred rabbits"; also Centzontōtōchtin) are a group of divine rabbits who meet for frequent drunken parties. They include Tepoztecatl, Texcatzonatl, Colhuatzincatl, and Macuiltochtli ("five-rabbit"). Their parents are Patecatl and Mayahuel and they may be brothers of Ixtlilton.

== Bibliography ==
- Clavigero, Francesco Saverio (1807) [1787]. The history of Mexico. Collected from Spanish and Mexican historians, from manuscripts, and ancient paintings of the Indians. Illustrated by charts and other copperplates. To which are added, critical dissertations on the land, the animals, and inhabitants of Mexico, 2 vols. Translated by Charles Cullen (2nd ed.). London: J. Johnson. OCLC 54014738.
- Miller, Mary; Karl Taube (1993). The Gods and Symbols of Ancient Mexico and the Maya: An Illustrated Dictionary of Mesoamerican Religion. London: Thames & Hudson. ISBN 0-500-05068-6. OCLC 27667317.
- Sahagún, Bernardino de (1997) [ca.1558–61]. Thelma D. Sullivan; H.B. Nicholson; Arthur J.O. Anderson; Charles E. Dibble; Eloise Quiñones Keber; Wayne Ruwet (eds.). Primeros Memoriales. Civilization of the American Indians series vol. 200, part 2. Norman: University of Oklahoma Press. ISBN 978-0-8061-2909-9. OCLC 35848992.
- Smith, Michael E. (2003). The Aztecs (2nd ed.). Malden, MA: Blackwell Publishing. ISBN 0-631-23015-7. OCLC 48579073.
- Wimmer, Alexis (2006). "Dictionnaire de la langue nahuatl classique" (in French and Nahuatl).
