= Mayahuel =

Aztec goddess of the maguey plant

- Goddess of maguey
- Member of the Nauhtzonteteo
- Mayahuel as depicted in the Codex Rios
- Abode: the volcano Popocatépetl
- Gender: Female
- Region: Mesoamerica
- Ethnic group: Aztec (Nahoa)

Genealogy
- Parents: Omecihuatl (Emerged by Tecpatl)
- Siblings: the Nauhtzonteteo (1,600 gods)
- Consort: Patecatl
- Children: Centzon Tōtōchtin (400 rabbits)

Mayahuel (Nahuatl pronunciation: [maˈjawel]) is the female deity associated with the maguey plant among cultures of central Mexico in the Postclassic era of pre-Columbian Mesoamerican chronology, and in particular of the Aztec cultures. As the personification of the maguey plant, Mayahuel is also part of a complex of interrelated maternal and fertility goddesses in Aztec religion and is also connected with notions of fecundity and nourishment.

== Description ==
=== Origins from the maguey plant ===
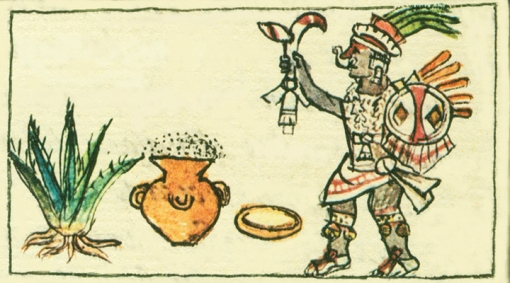
The making of pulque, as illustrated in the Florentine Codex (Book 1 Appendix, fo.40)

Maguey is a flowering plant of the genus Agave, native to parts of southwestern modern United States and Mexico. The depictions of Mayahuel in the Codex Borgia and the Codex Borbonicus show the deity perched upon a maguey plant. The deity's positioning in both illustrations, as well as the same blue pigment used to depict her body and the body of the maguey plant on Page 8 of the Codex Borbonicus, give the sense that she and the plant are one. Furthermore, the Codex Borbonicus displays Mayahuel as holding what looks like rope, presumably spun from the maguey plant fibers. Rope was only one of the many products extracted from the maguey plant. Products extracted from the maguey plant were used extensively across highlands and southeastern Mesoamerica, with the thorns used in ritual bloodletting ceremonies and fibers extracted from the leaves worked into ropes, netting, bags, and cloth. Yet, perhaps the maguey product most well-known and celebrated by the Aztecs is the alcoholic beverage octli, or later named pulque, produced from the fermented sap of the maguey plant and used prominently in many public ceremonies and on other ritual occasions. By extension, Mayahuel is also often shown in contexts associated with pulque. Although some secondary sources describe her as a "pulque goddess," she remains most strongly associated with the plant as the source, rather than pulque as the end product.

== Gallery of depictions in primary sources ==
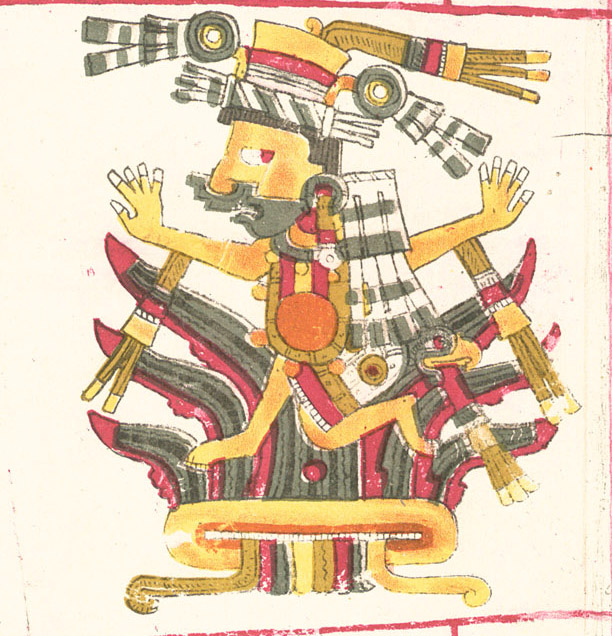
Mayahuel as depicted in the Codex Borgia.

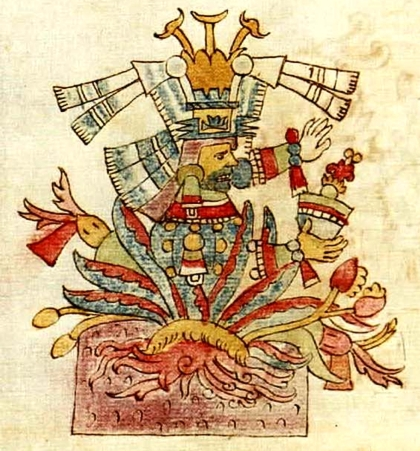
Mayahuel as depicted in the Codex Ríos.

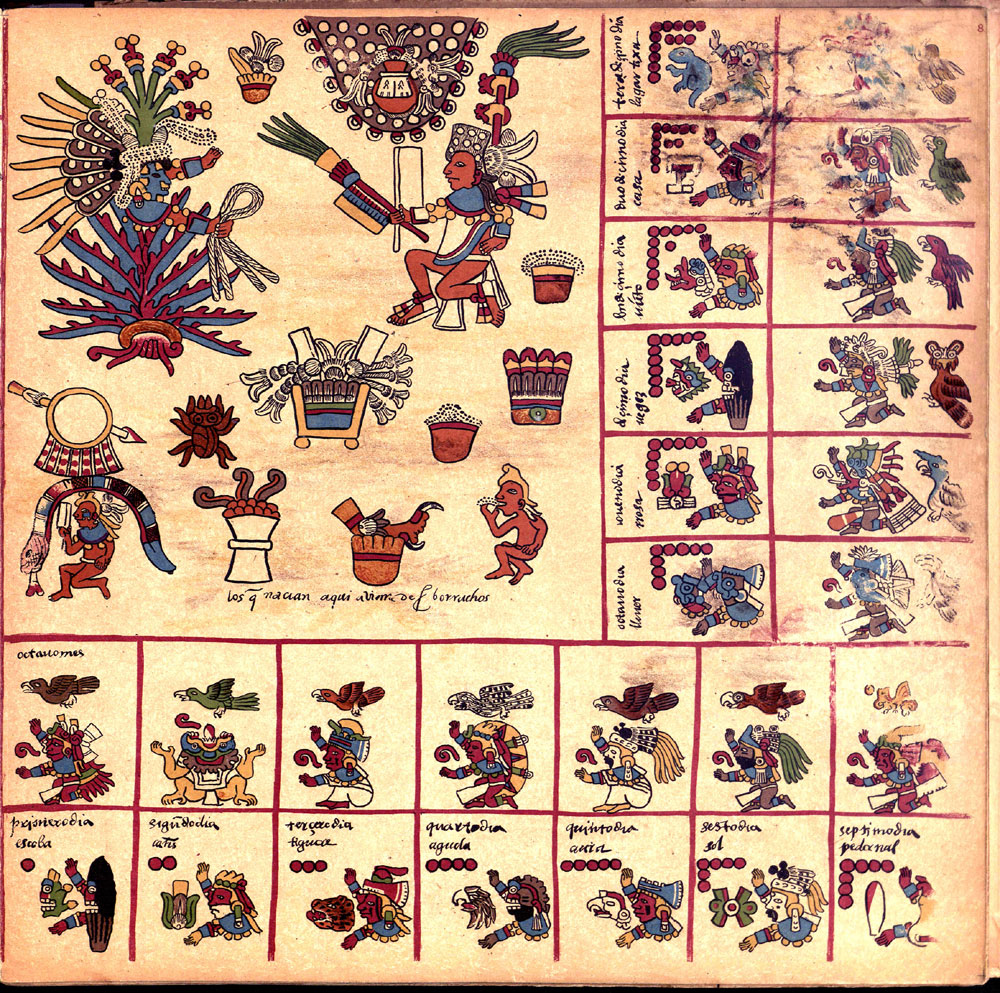
Mayahuel as depicted in the Codex Borbonicus (on the upper left side of Page 8).

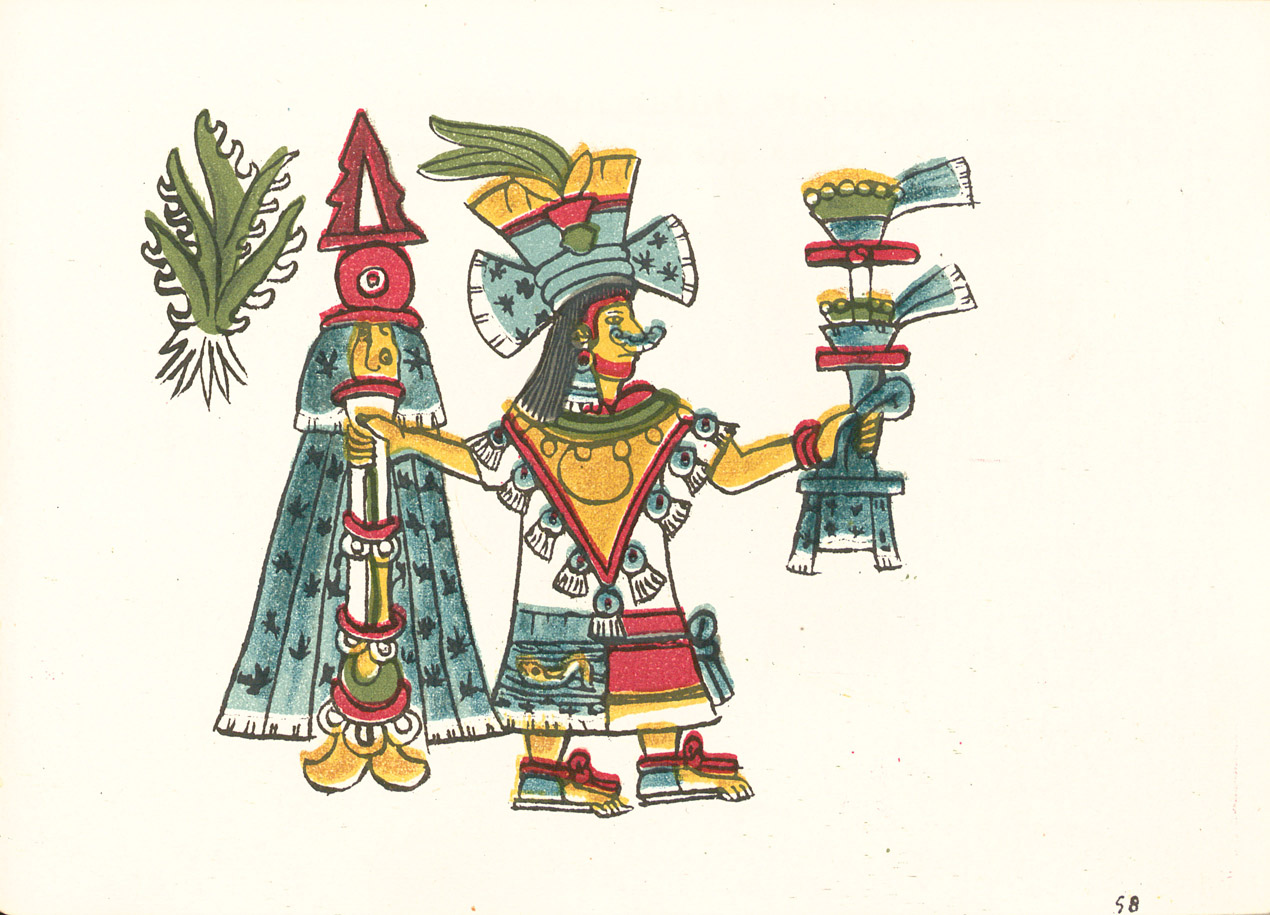
Mayahuel as depicted in the Codex Magliabechiano (on page 58 recto).

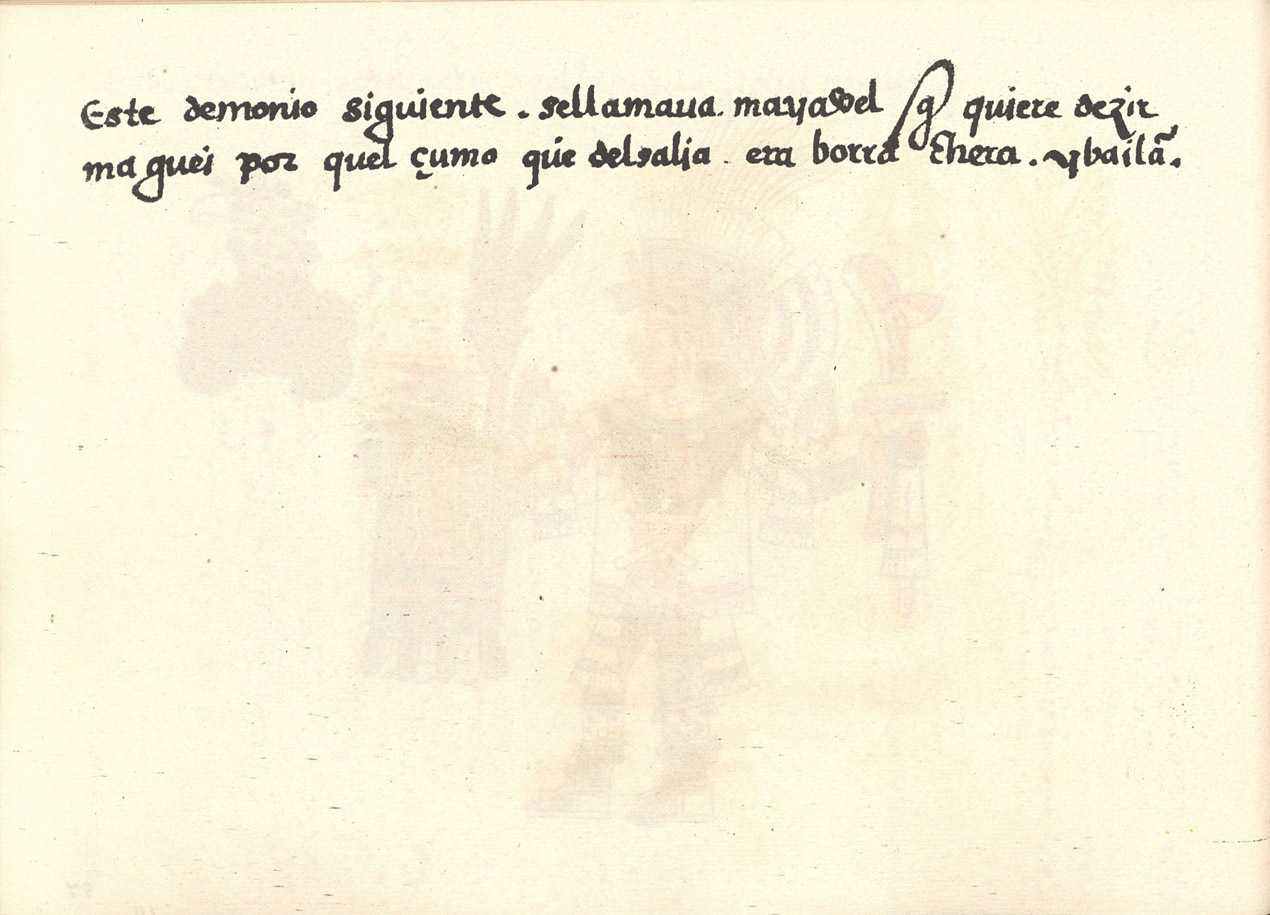
The accompanying description of Mayahuel in the Codex Magliabechiano (on page 57 verso). Translation: "The next demon was called Mayahuel, which means maguey, because the juice that comes from it was an intoxicant. And they dance."

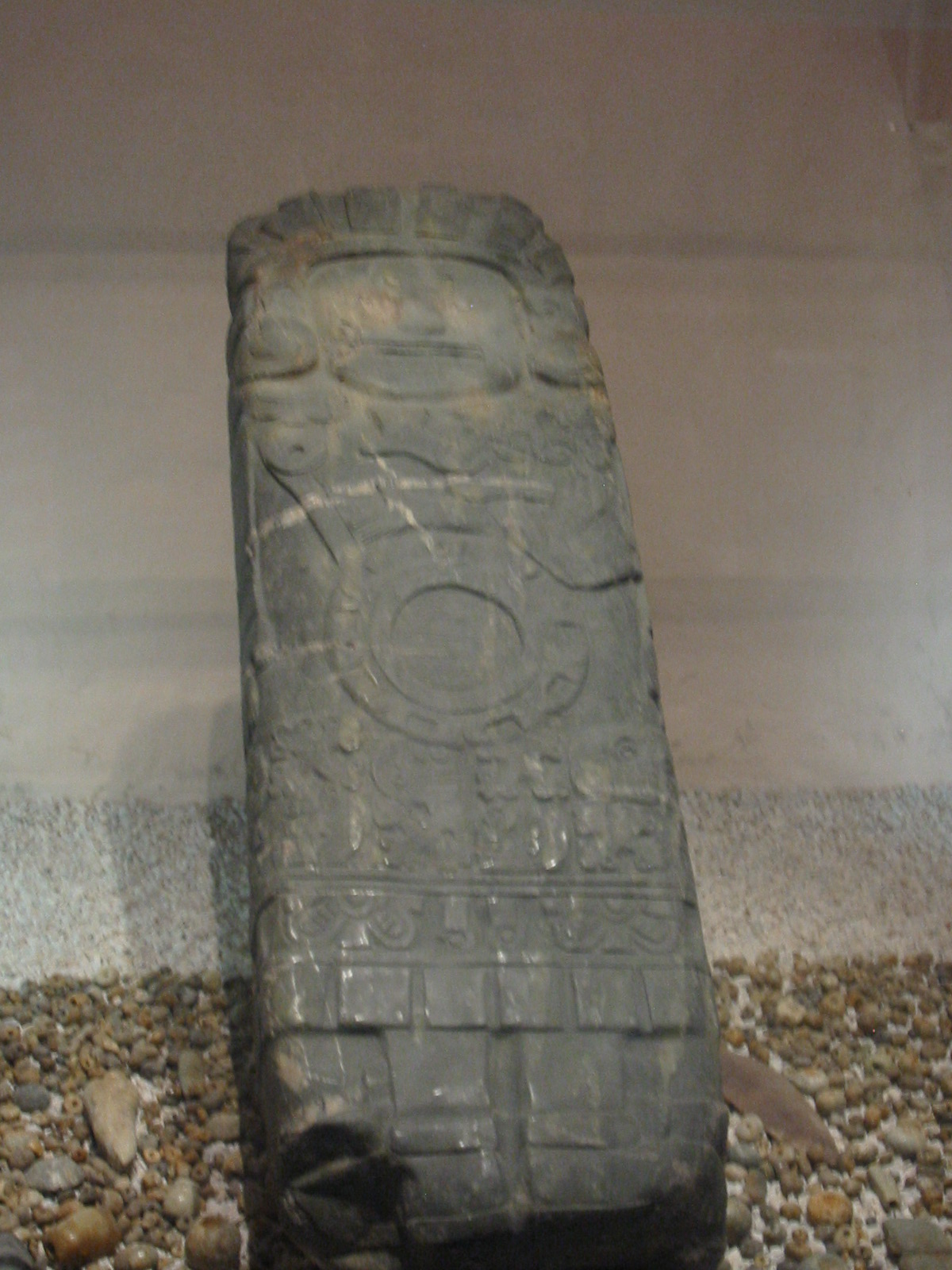
Carving of Mayahuel displayed at the Great Pyramid of Tenochtitlan, now displayed at the Templo Mayor Museum in Mexico City.
