= Pulque =

Alcoholic beverage made from agave

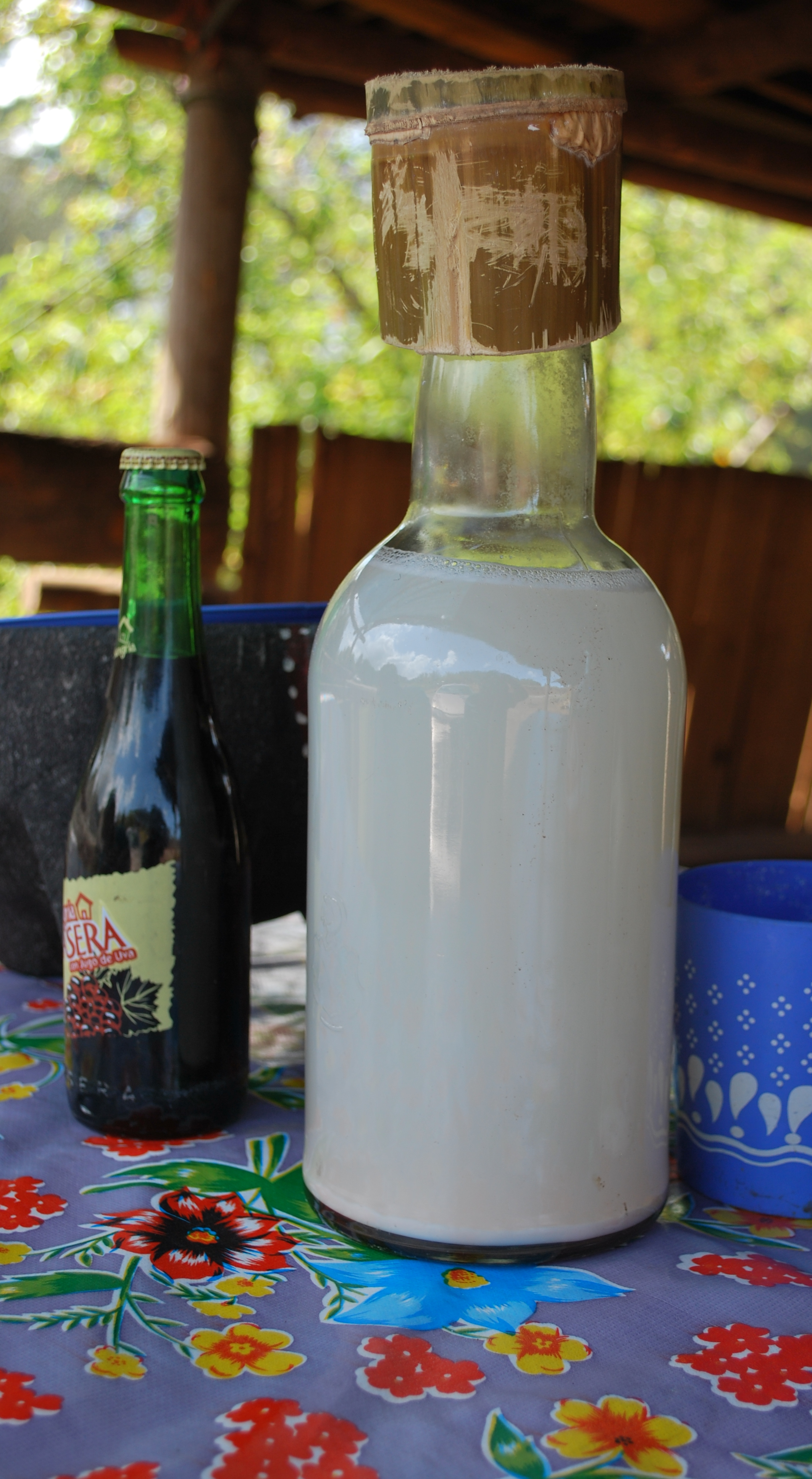
- Bottle of unflavored pulque with bamboo cap
- Type: Fermented alcoholic beverage
- Origin: Mexico, (Mesoamerica)
- Introduced: Ancient, before CE 200
- Alcohol by volume: 2–7%
- Proof (US): 4–14°
- Color: Milky-white
- Ingredients: Sap of Agave americana
- Related products: Mezcal, bacanora, raicilla, tequila

Pulque (Spanish: ['pulke]; Classical Nahuatl: metoctli), occasionally known as octli or agave wine, is an alcoholic beverage made from the fermented sap of the agave (maguey) plant. It is traditional in central Mexico, where it has been produced for millennia. It has the color of milk, a rather viscous consistency and a sour yeast-like taste.

The drink's history extends back to the pre-Columbian period, when it was considered sacred, and its use was limited to certain classes of people. After the Spanish conquest of the Aztec Empire, the drink became secular and its consumption rose. The consumption of pulque reached its peak in the late 19th century. In the 20th century, the drink fell into decline, mostly because of competition from beer, which became more prevalent with the arrival of European immigrants, but pulque remains popular in many parts of Central Mexico, however, and there have been some efforts to revive the drink's popularity elsewhere through tourism. Similar drinks exist elsewhere in Latin America, such as guarango in Ecuador (see miske).

== Description ==
Pulque is a milk-colored, somewhat viscous liquid that produces a light foam. It is made by fermenting the sap of certain types of maguey (agave) plants. In contrast, mezcal comes from the cooked heart of certain agave plants, and tequila comes mostly or entirely from blue agave. About six maguey varieties are best for producing pulque. The name pulque is derived from Nahuatl. The original name of the drink was iztāc octli [ˈistaːk ˈokt͡ɬi] (white pulque), the term pulque was probably mistakenly derived by the Spanish from the octli poliuhqui [ˈokt͡ɬi poˈliwki], which meant "spoiled pulque".

It is one of two types of fermented agave drink known in Mexico at the time of European contact: pulque is made from sap taken from the stem, while the other is made from pit-roasted stems and leaf bases.

== Maguey ==
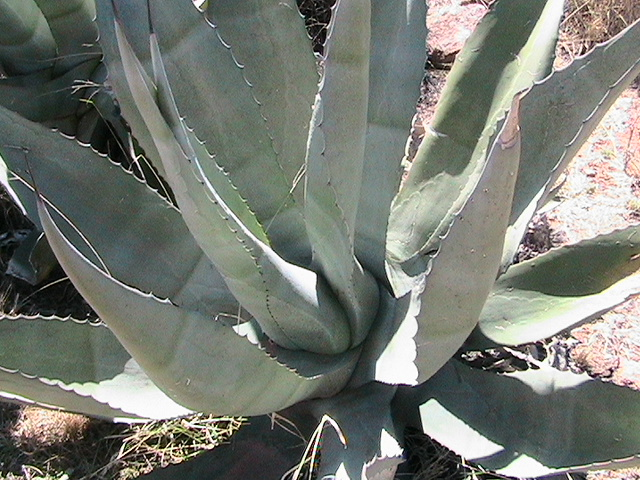
Close up of a maguey plant

The maguey plant, also called a "century plant" in English, is native to Mexico. It grows best in the cold, dry climates of the rocky central highlands north and east of Mexico City, especially in Hidalgo and Tlaxcala. People have cultivated maguey since at least 200 CE in Tula, Tulancingo, and Teotihuacan, and have used wild plants for much longer. Historically, the plant has had many uses. People can extract fibers from the thick leaves to make rope or fabric; use its thorns as needles or punches; and use the leaf membrane as paper or for cooking. The name maguey was given by the Spanish, who picked it up from the Taíno. This is still its common name in Spanish, while Agave is the genus name in scientific nomenclature. The Nahuatl name of the plant is metl.

Pulque production is complex and requires killing the maguey plant. As the plant nears maturity, the center begins to swell and elongate as the plant gathers stored sugar to send up a single flower stalk, which may reach up to 20 feet in height. However, plants destined for pulque production have this flower stalk cut off, leaving a depressed surface 12-18 inches in diameter. In this center, the maguey sap, known as aguamiel (honeywater), collects. It takes a maguey plant 12 years to mature enough to produce the sap for pulque.

== History ==
=== Mythological origins ===
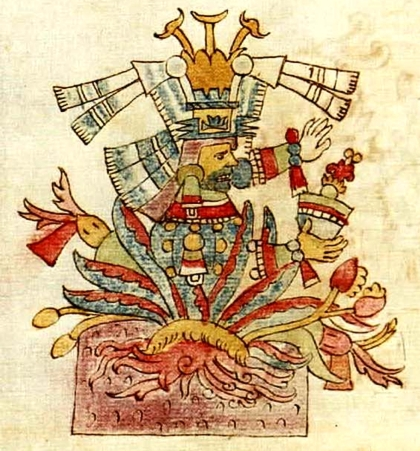
Depiction of the goddess Mayahuel

Pulque has been drunk for at least 2000 years, and its origins are the subject of various stories and myths. Most involve Mayahuel, the goddess of the maguey. People thought the aguamiel collected from the plant's center was her blood. Other deities, such as the Centzon Totochtin (400 rabbits), are associated with it by representing the drink's effects and are the children of Mayahuel. Another version involving Mayahuel has her as a mortal woman who discovered how to collect aguamiel, but someone named Pantecatl [panˈtekat͡ɬ] discovered how to make pulque.

In another story, the Tlacuache [t͡ɬaˈkʷat͡ʃe] (opossum) discovered pulque, using his human-like hands to dig into the maguey and extract the naturally fermenting juice. He became the first drunk. Tlacuache was thought to set the course of rivers. The rivers he set were generally straight except when he was drunk. Then they followed Tlacuache's meandering path from cantina to cantina.

Another account traces the discovery of aguamiel to the Toltec Empire, when a noble named Papantzin tried to get the emperor to marry his daughter, Xochitl. He sent her to the capital with an offering of aguamiel, honey of the agave plant. The emperor and princess wed, and they named their son Meconetzin [mekoˈnet͡sin] (maguey son). In other versions of the story, Xochitl is credited with discovering pulque.

=== Pre-Hispanic period ===
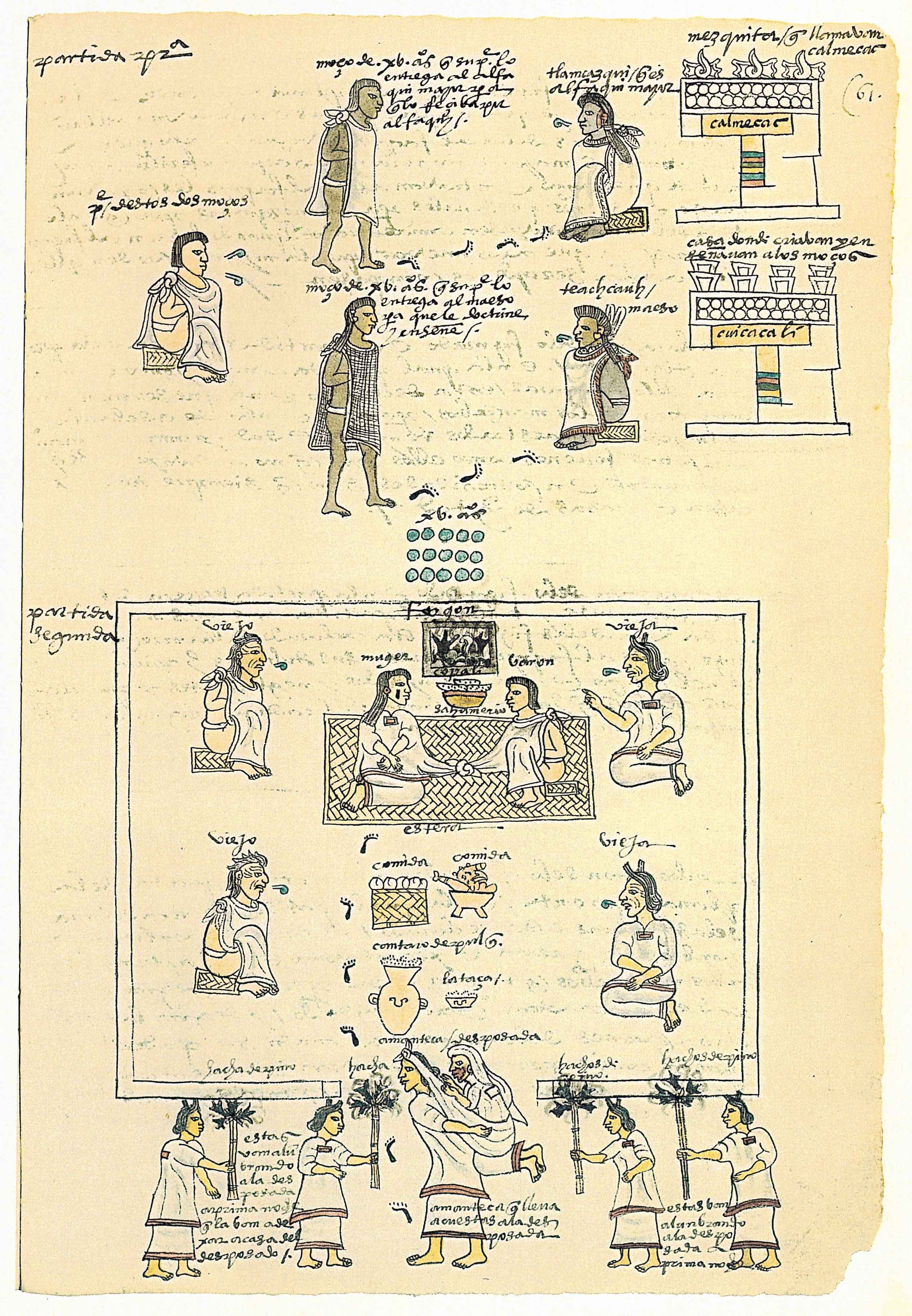
Codex Mendoza, an early 16th-century manuscript, showing Aztec elders and pulque in a vessel (lower center)

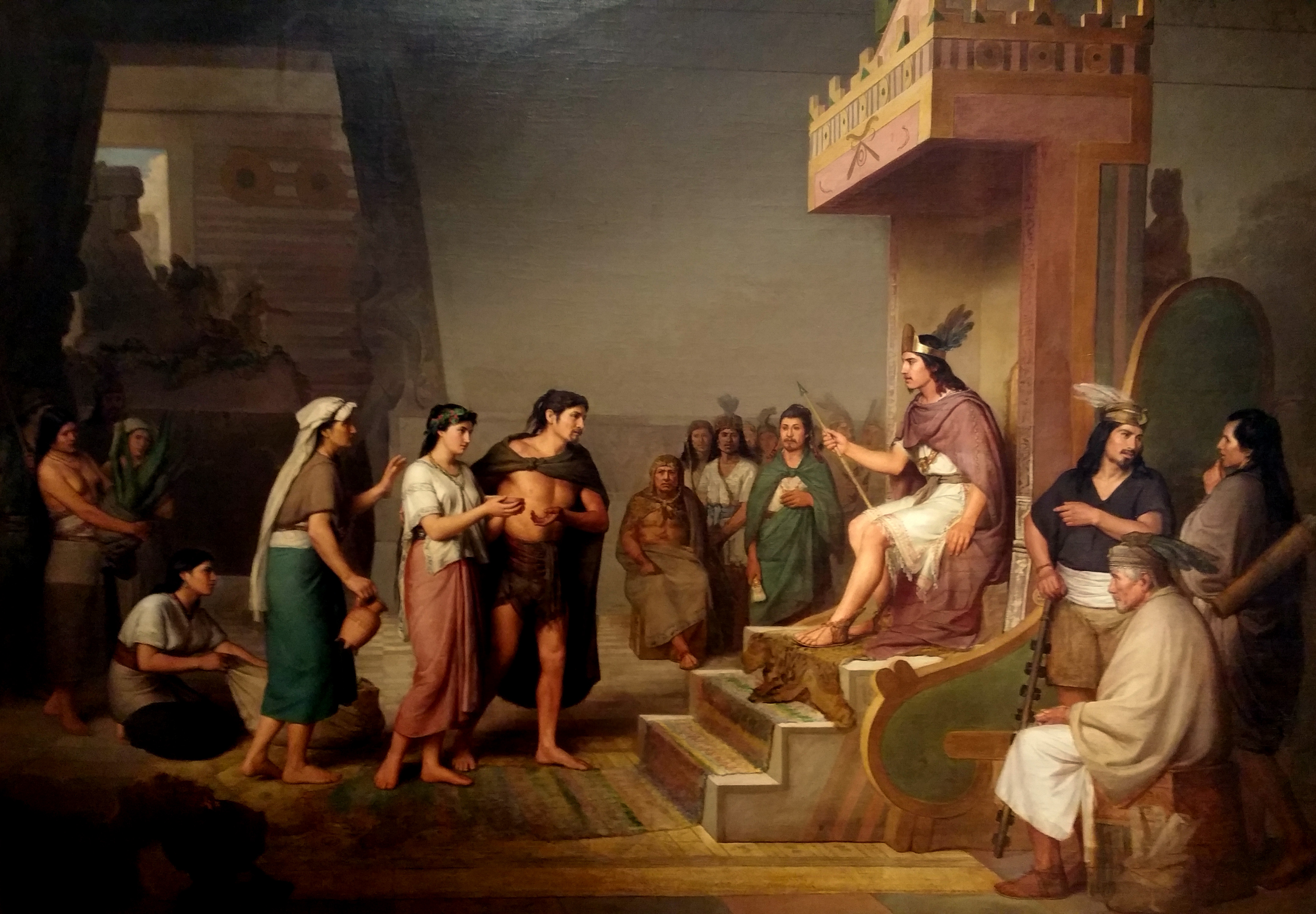
The discovery of pulque by nineteenth-century Mexican painter José Obregón.

The maguey was one of the most sacred and important plants in ancient Mexico. It had a privileged place in mythology, religious rituals, and the Mesoamerican economy. Pulque appears in several graphic representations from pre-colonial times, beginning with stone carvings from about 200 CE. The first major work involving pulque is a large mural called the "Pulque Drinkers", unearthed in 1968 at the pyramid of Cholula, Puebla. People most likely discovered aguamiel and fermented pulque by observing rodents gnawing and scratching at the plant to drink the seeping sap. Aguamiel can ferment within the plant itself.

In Mexico's central highlands, only certain indigenous people drank pulque, and only under certain conditions. They drank it as a ritual beverage during festivals honoring the goddess Mayahuel and the god Mixcoatl. It was drunk by priests and sacrificial victims to increase the priests' enthusiasm and to ease the suffering of the victim. Many Aztec codices, such as the Borbonicus Codex, reference the nobility's and priesthood's use of pulque to celebrate victories. Among commoners, it was permitted only to the elderly and pregnant women. Production of pulque was ritualized, and the brewers were superstitious. They would abstain from sex during the fermentation period because they believed that sexual intercourse would sour the process.

=== Colonial period ===
After the Conquest, pulque lost its sacred character, and both natives and Spaniards began drinking it. The Spanish initially made no laws regarding its use. It became a lucrative source of tax revenue, but by 1672, public drunkenness had become such a problem that the viceregal government created regulations to curb its consumption. A maximum of 36 "pulquerías" were permitted for Mexico City, which had to be located in open areas, be without doors, and close at sundown. Food, music, dancing, and the co-mingling of the sexes were prohibited. However, pulque continued to play a major role in Mexico's socioeconomic history during colonial times and in the early years of Independence. During this period, it was the fourth-largest source of tax revenue. At the end of the 17th century, the Jesuits began large-scale production of the drink to finance their educational institutions. As a result, pulque production shifted from a home brew to a commercially produced drink.

=== Drunkenness depicted in art ===
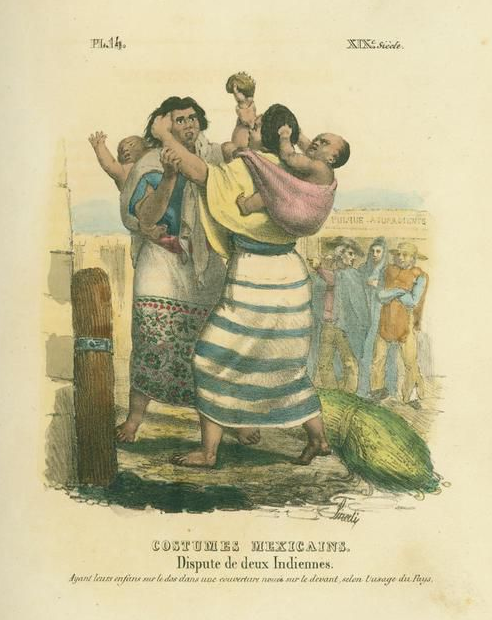
Dispute between two Indigenous women outside a pulquería. The sign above the male observers of the fight says "pulque. aguardiente." Claudio Linati 1828.

The casta system of racial hierarchy was created in Spanish America so elites could classify individuals into groups based on phenotype and perceived social class, and assign them characteristics supposedly inherent to their group. Often artists portrayed mixed-race castas. This form of Mexican art portrayed castas in settings that were typical of their social group. Artists used pulque to show polarization between different castas. Before the Spanish colonization of the Americas, people used pulque for religious ceremonies in Mesoamerica, but after the Spanish conquest, pulque consumption lost its ritual meaning.

Some Casta paintings depict pulque consumption. Some casta painters depicted different castas safely consuming and selling pulque. Other casta painters depicted Indigenous Americans intoxicated in the streets and incapacitated, which, as a result, required their families to escort them home. In one of his 1828 depictions, Italian lithographer Claudio Linati showed two Indigenous women engaged in a dispute outside of a pulquería.

=== Post-colonial period ===
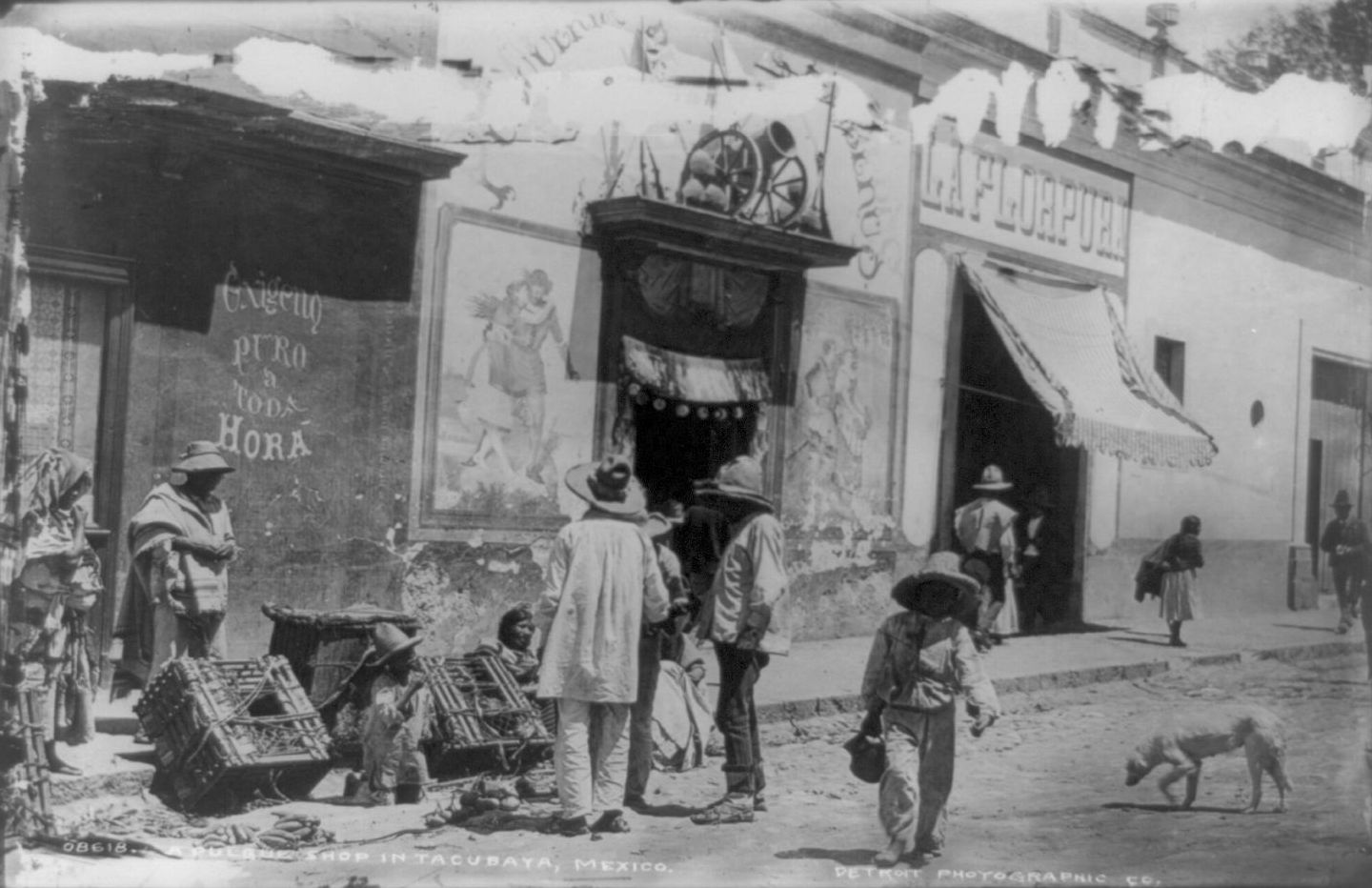
A pulqueria in Tacubaya in the 1880s

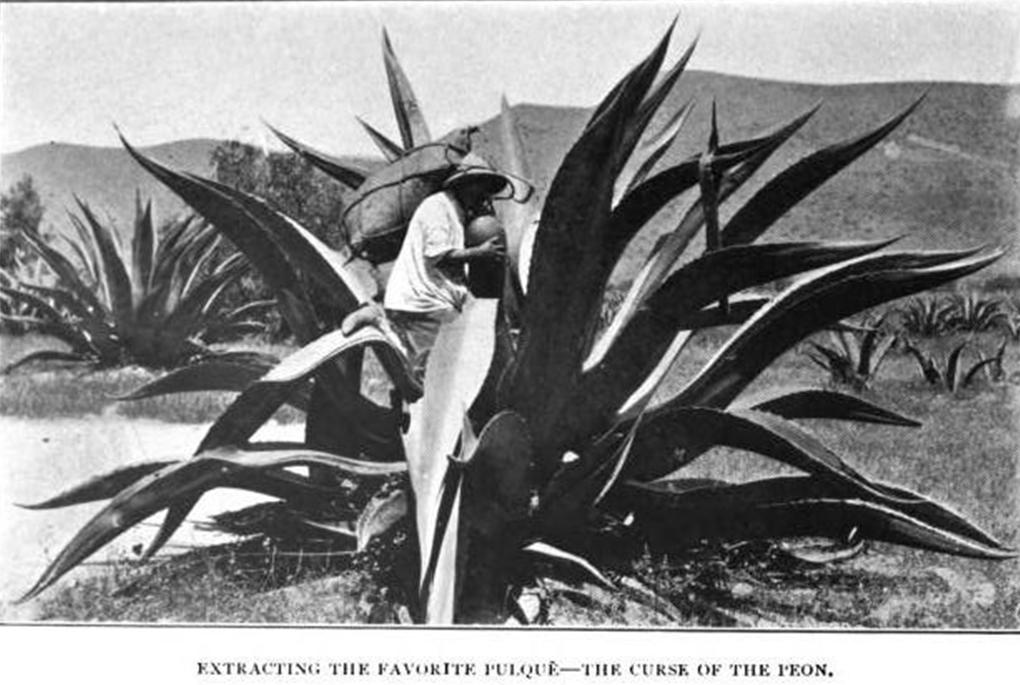
Tlaquichero extracting juice from an agave for pulque, ca. 1900. C. B. Waite photographer.

Pulque production exploded after Independence, when regulations on pulque producers ended, and Mexican nationalism increased. From then until the 1860s, pulque haciendas multiplied, especially in Hidalgo and Tlaxcala states. In 1866, the first railway between Veracruz and Mexico City began operations, crossing through Hidalgo. This line soon became known as the "Pulque Train" because it brought supplies of the drink to the capital daily. This production and easy shipment made Hidalgo rich and gave rise to a "pulque aristocracy" made up of some of the time's most powerful families: Torres Adalid, Pimenta y Fagoaga, Macedo, and others. At its peak, about 300 pulque haciendas existed. Some still remain in the plains of Apan and Zempoala, in Hidalgo. Pulque peaked in popularity in the late 19th century, when rich and poor alike enjoyed it.

Depictions of tlaquicheros, pulquerías, and pulque haciendas were the subject of photographers in the late Porfiriato, including photographers C. B. Waite, Hugo Brehme, and Sergei Eisenstein. The tlaquichero was perhaps the most widely known and successful image of Mexican types.

As late as 1953, Hidalgo and Tlaxcala still obtained 30 and 50%, respectively, of their total revenues from pulque. This has since diminished, as irrigation, roads, and other infrastructure have enabled other, more lucrative enterprises.

=== Decline ===
Despite its former popularity, pulque accounts for only 10% of alcoholic beverages consumed in Mexico today. People still drink pulque in Mexico, mostly in the central highlands and predominantly in rural and poor areas. It has acquired a general connotation of being for the lower class, while European-style beer consumption flourished throughout the 20th century.

The complex, delicate fermentation process of pulque has long limited its distribution, as it does not keep long and agitation during transport speeds degradation. Since pre-Hispanic times, consumption has mostly been limited to Mexico's central highlands.

Pulque's decline began in the first decade of the 20th century, when the Mexican Revolution reduced production. In the 1930s, the government of Lázaro Cárdenas campaigned against pulque, as part of an effort to reduce alcoholic consumption in general. But the most decisive factor in pulque's decline was the introduction of beer.

European immigrant brewers in the early 20th century ran a campaign against native pulque, claiming that pulque producers used a muñeca (doll), a textile bag containing human or animal feces, placed in the aguamiel to hasten fermentation. Some pulque producers have insisted that the muñeca is a complete fabrication, but modern historians suggest that it did happen, although only rarely. Beer producers promoted the idea that pulque was generally made this way, generally by word of mouth and insinuation. This was done to inhibit pulque sales and to promote the consumption of beer, which they claimed was "rigorously hygienic and modern".

As a result, people now generally look down on pulque and drink it far less, while Mexican-brewed beer is ubiquitous and extremely popular. Pulque's popularity is low and continues to fall. Before 1992, about 20 trucks came every three days to Xochimilco (in southern Mexico City) to deliver pulque, but by 2007 that number had fallen to one or two. Only five pulquerias remained in this district, down from 18. The situation is similar in most other parts of Mexico. The remaining pulquerias are small establishments that sell a product made by small producers.

In Hidalgo, where most maguey is grown, fields of this plant are disappearing, with barley taking its place. Most maguey plants here mark property boundaries. Many of these plants do not survive long because people often vandalize them. An estimated 10,000 plants are mutilated each week by cutting off the lower leaves for barbacoa or destroying them completely to look for the edible white grubs or ant eggs that can inhabit them.

A recent series of PBS travel shows features pulque and says it is once again popular, with a retro movement leading younger people seeking to establish their Mexican heritage to drink it in large quantities. It has become a trendy drink among youth and those seeking to return to their roots. The prohibition on female drinkers has also been lifted, and co-ed pulquerias are now the norm.

Flavored syrups, seasonings, and more are now common, with one pulqueria offering 48 flavors in its special.

== Production ==
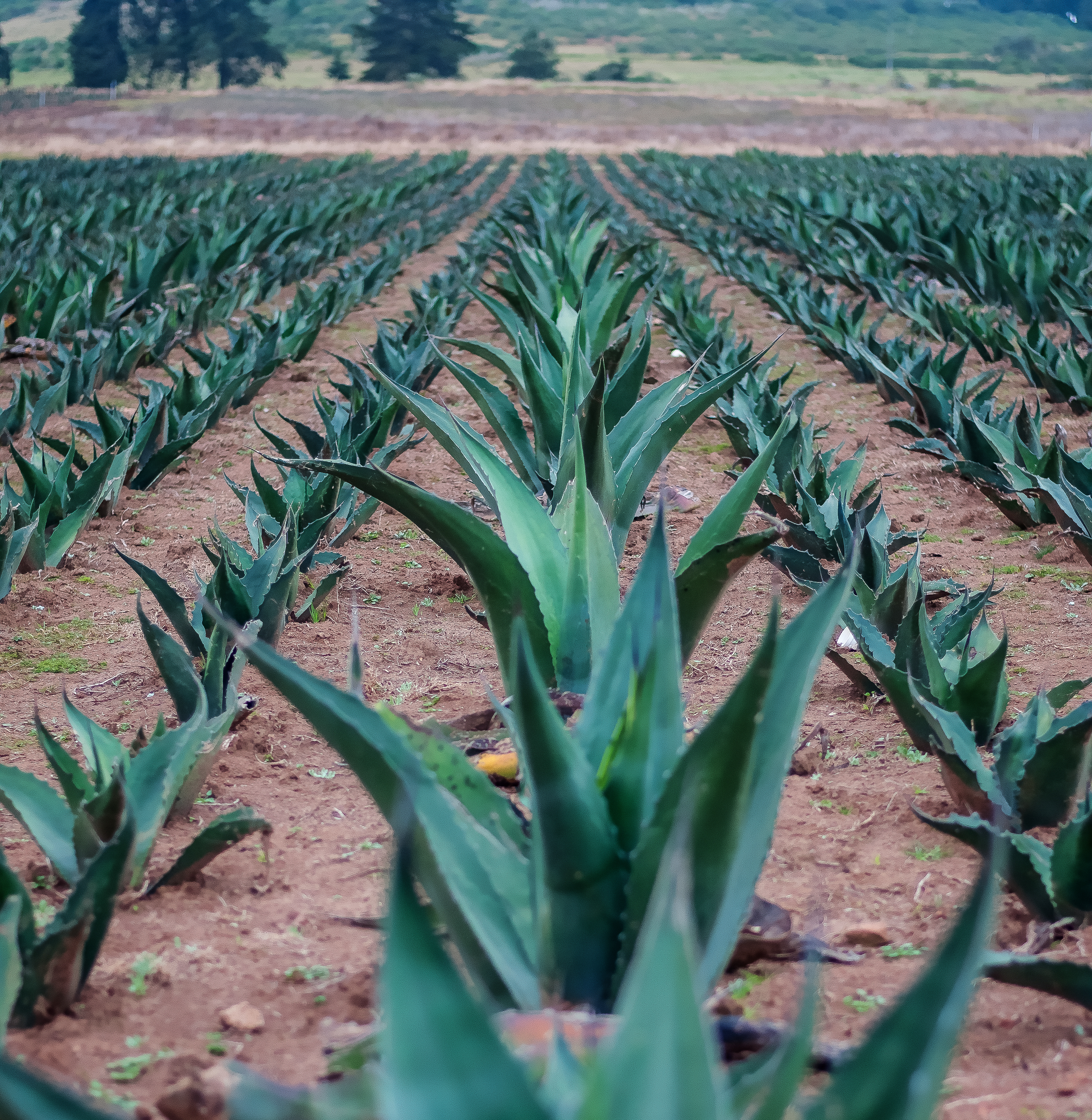
A field of maguey

The production process is long and delicate. The maguey plant needs 12 years of maturation before the sap, or aguamiel, can be extracted, but a good plant can produce for up to one year. This aguamiel can be drunk straight, but it is alcoholic only after a fermentation process that can start in the plant itself. People collect this liquid twice a day from the plant, yielding about five or six liters per day. Today, they collect it with a steel scoop, but in the past they used an elongated gourd as a tube to suck the juice out. Between harvests, they bend the plant's leaves over the center, where the juice collects, to keep out bugs and dirt. People regularly scrape out this center to keep the plant's sap production active. Most maguey plants produce this aguamiel for about four to six months before they finally die. Some plants can yield up to 600 L of pulque.

Workers collect the juice in 50-liter barrels and carry it from the field to the fermentation vats. These vats, called tinas, are located in a special building called a tinacal. The word comes from the Spanish tina and the Nahuatl calli, meaning house of vats. When pulque haciendas peaked in the late 19th century, hacienda life revolved around these tinacals. They were typically rectangular stone sheds with wooden roofs. The upper walls opened for air circulation, and the façades were sometimes decorated with indigenous designs or other images associated with pulque production. One popular motif depicted Xochitl's discovery of pulque. Other popular elements were the images of the hacienda's patron saint and the Virgin of Guadalupe. Inside, vats of cowhide stretched over wooden frames lined up against the walls. In larger tinacals, three or four rows of vats stood. Today, the tinas are made of oak, plastic, or fiberglass and hold about 1,000 liters each.

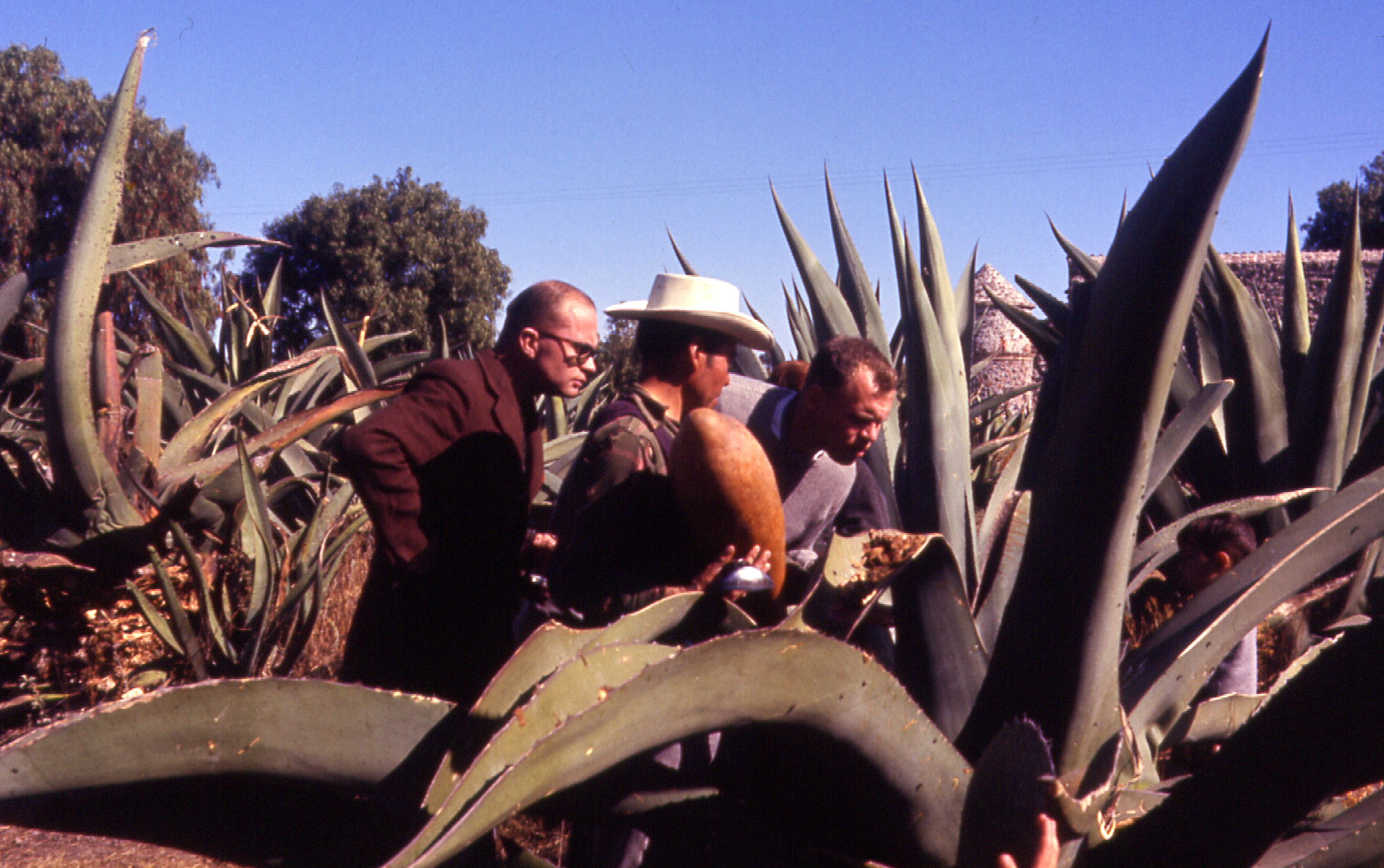
A tlachiquero collecting maguey juice (1964, Hidalgo, Mexico)

After adding the juice to the fermentation vats, they add mature seed pulque (semilla or xanaxtli) to "jump-start" the process. Unlike beer, pulque fermentation relies on the bacterium Zymomonas mobilis (syn. Thermobacterium mobile) rather than yeast. Those in charge of the fermentation process guard their trade secrets, passing them on from father to son. Fermentation takes seven to 14 days, and the process seems more like art than science. A number of factors can affect fermenting pulque, such as temperature, humidity and the quality of the aguamiel. Finished pulque usually reaches 2–7% alcohol by volume (ABV).

The process is complex and delicate and can go sour at any point; various rituals and prohibitions have developed around it. Songs and prayers may be offered, and women, children, and strangers are not allowed inside the tinacal.

Just before peak fermentation, vendors quickly ship pulque to market in barrels. The fermentation process is continuous, so the pulque must be consumed within a certain time before it spoils.

== Consumption ==
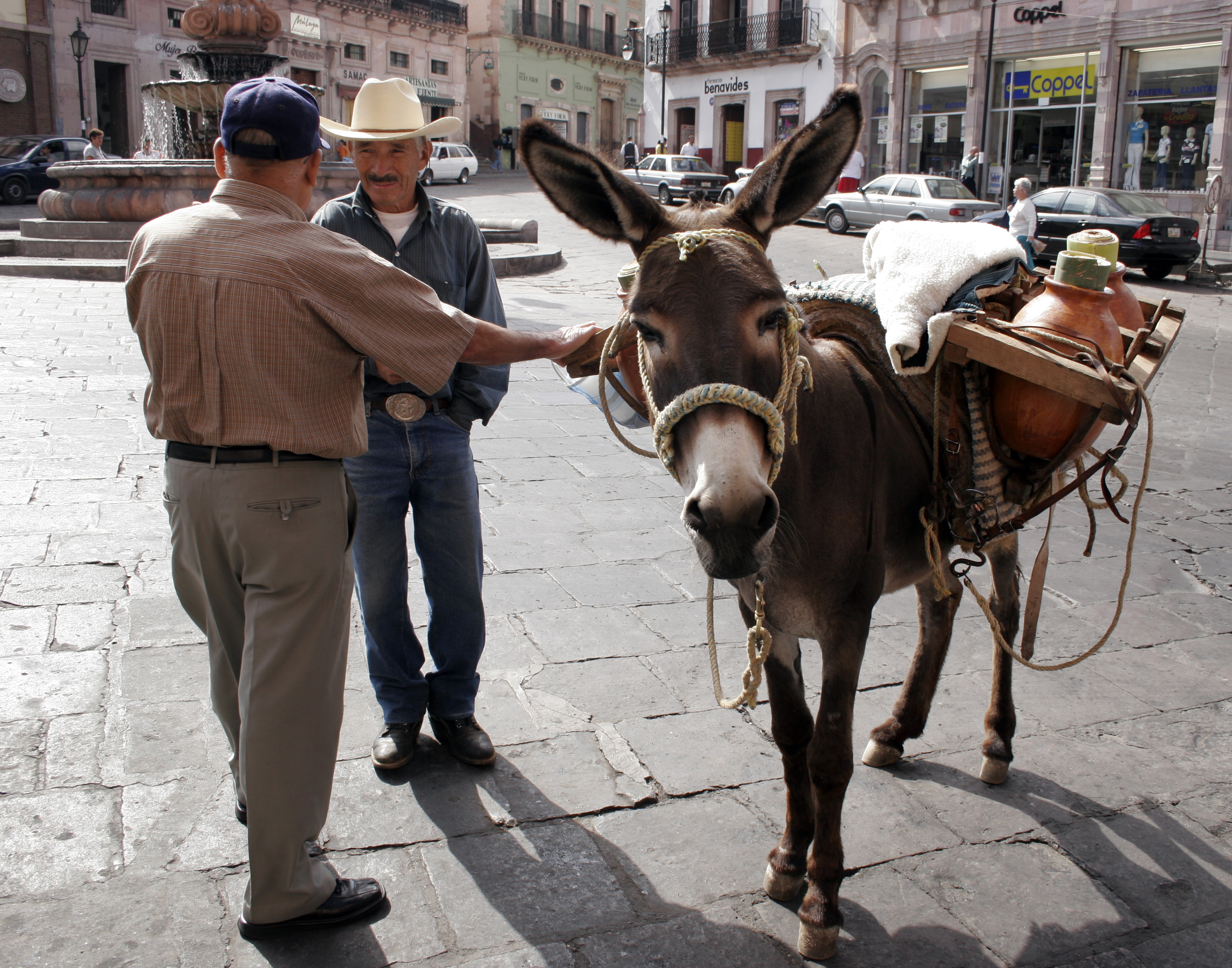
Pulque donkey and vendor in Zacatecas City (2006)

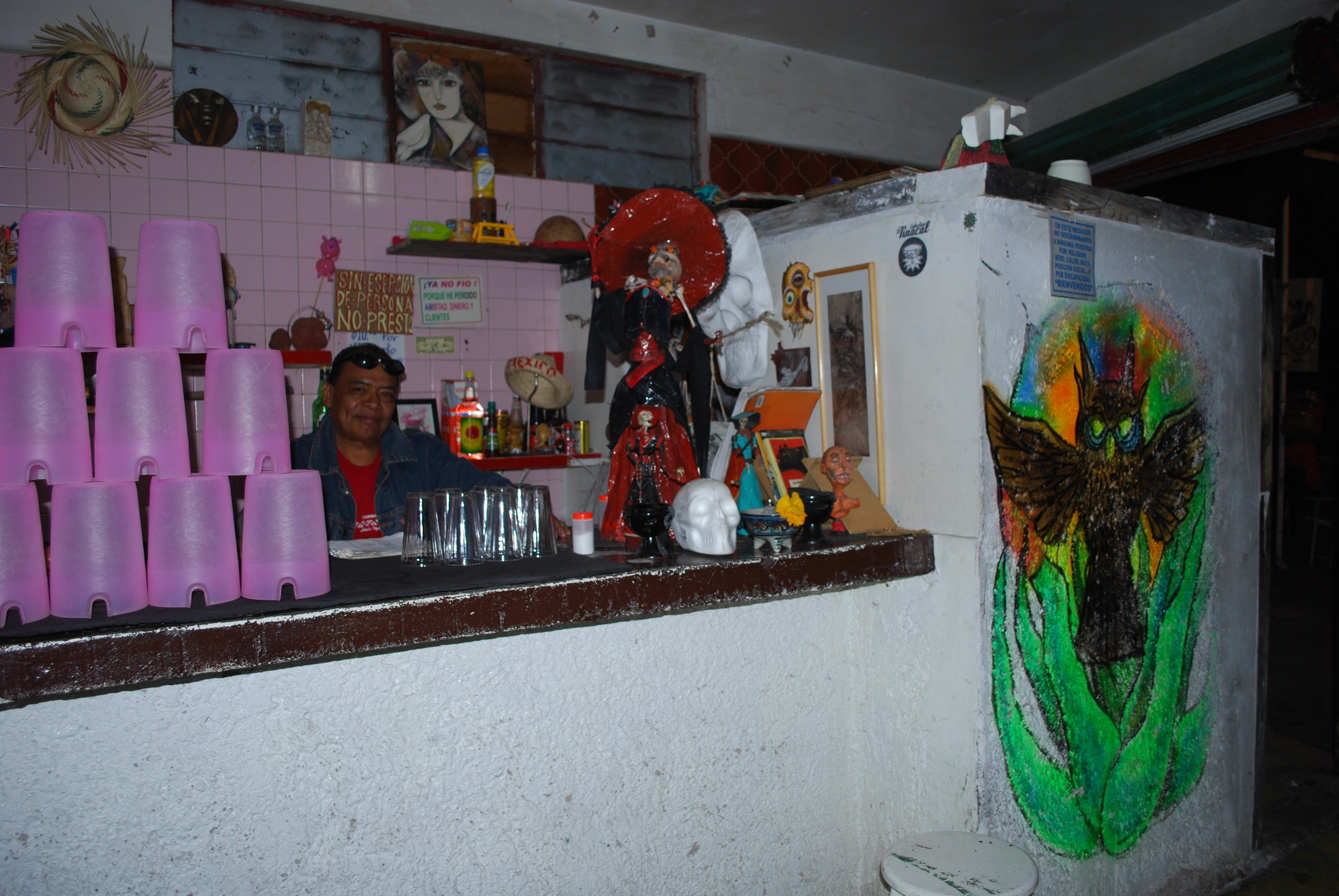
Tending the bar at Pulquería Tecolote in Santa Marta Acatitla, Mexico City (2015)

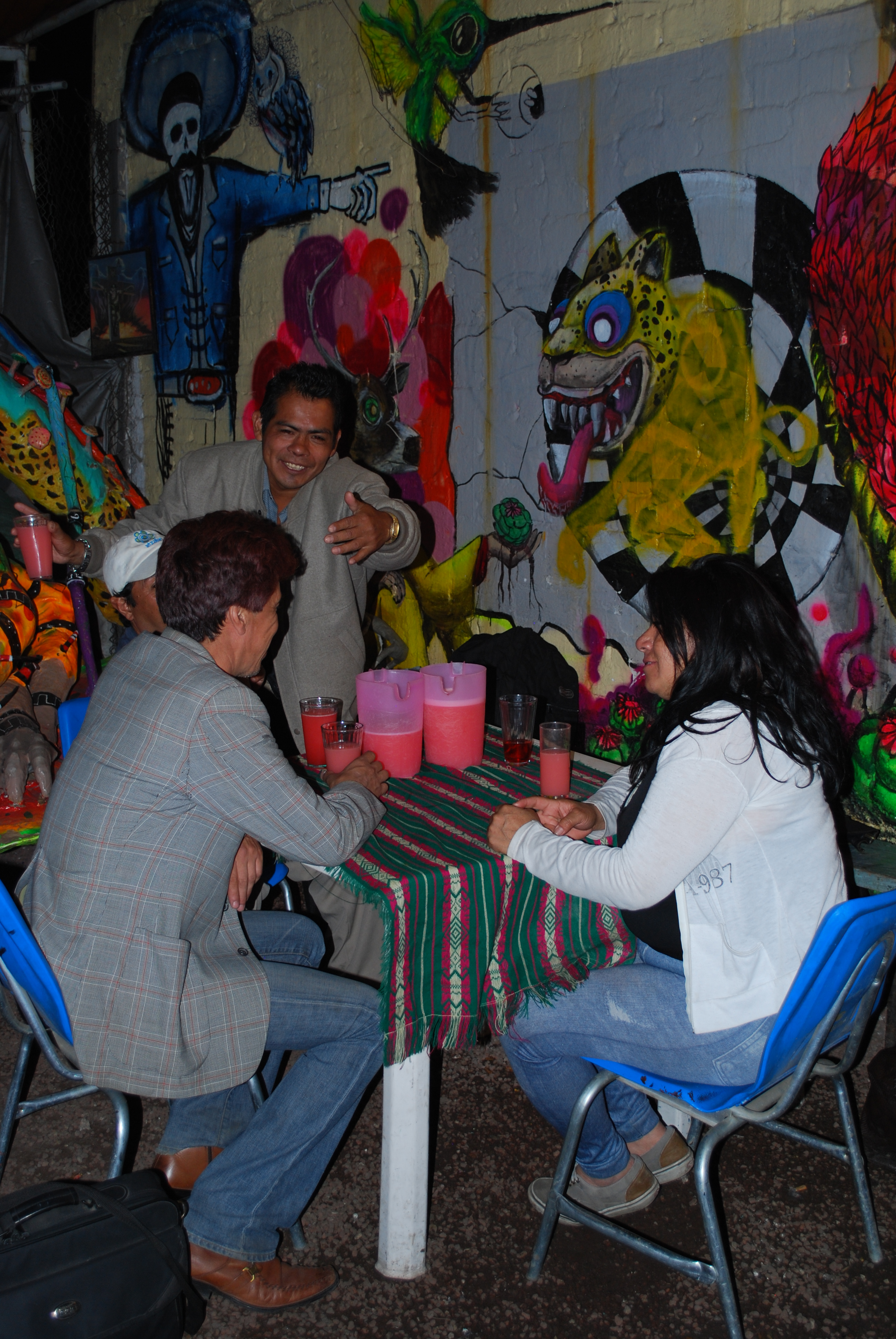
Customers at Pulquería Tecolote (2015)

Most pulque is consumed in bars called pulquerías. At the beginning of the 20th century, more than 1,000 were located in Mexico City alone. By the early 20th century, pulquerías became socially accepted, and some were places of great elegance. Whether for rich or poor, two features stood out: odd or catchy names and murals decorating the walls. Names included (translated) "My Office", "Memories of the Future", "Drink and Go", "I'm Waiting for You Here at the Corner", and, across the street from the National Chamber of Deputies, "The Recreation Center of Those Across the Street". Diego Rivera once said one of the most important manifestations of Mexican painting was the murals that decorated the facades and interiors of pulquerías. One tradition maintained at the beginning of the 20th century was to put sawdust on the floor. The tradition at that time was to begin a pulque-drinking session by spilling a little on the floor or ground as an offering to Mother Earth. Traditional pulquerías tend to be like clubs with closed membership, with casual visitors ignored or sometimes stared at. Frequent visits and heavy consumption tend to win acceptance. While some establishments may forbid women, it is more common for establishments to provide a separate seating area for them. Intermingling of the sexes is not permitted. In the more rural areas of Hidalgo and Tlaxcala, where most pulque is made, the pulque is fresher and better. A vendor usually displays a white flag over the door when a fresh shipment has arrived.

Traditionally, people serve pulque from large barrels on ice. and served into glasses, using a jicara, which is a half of a calabash tree gourd. The bartender is called a jicarero. In a pulquería, cruzado (meaning something like "bottoms up") is a common salute.

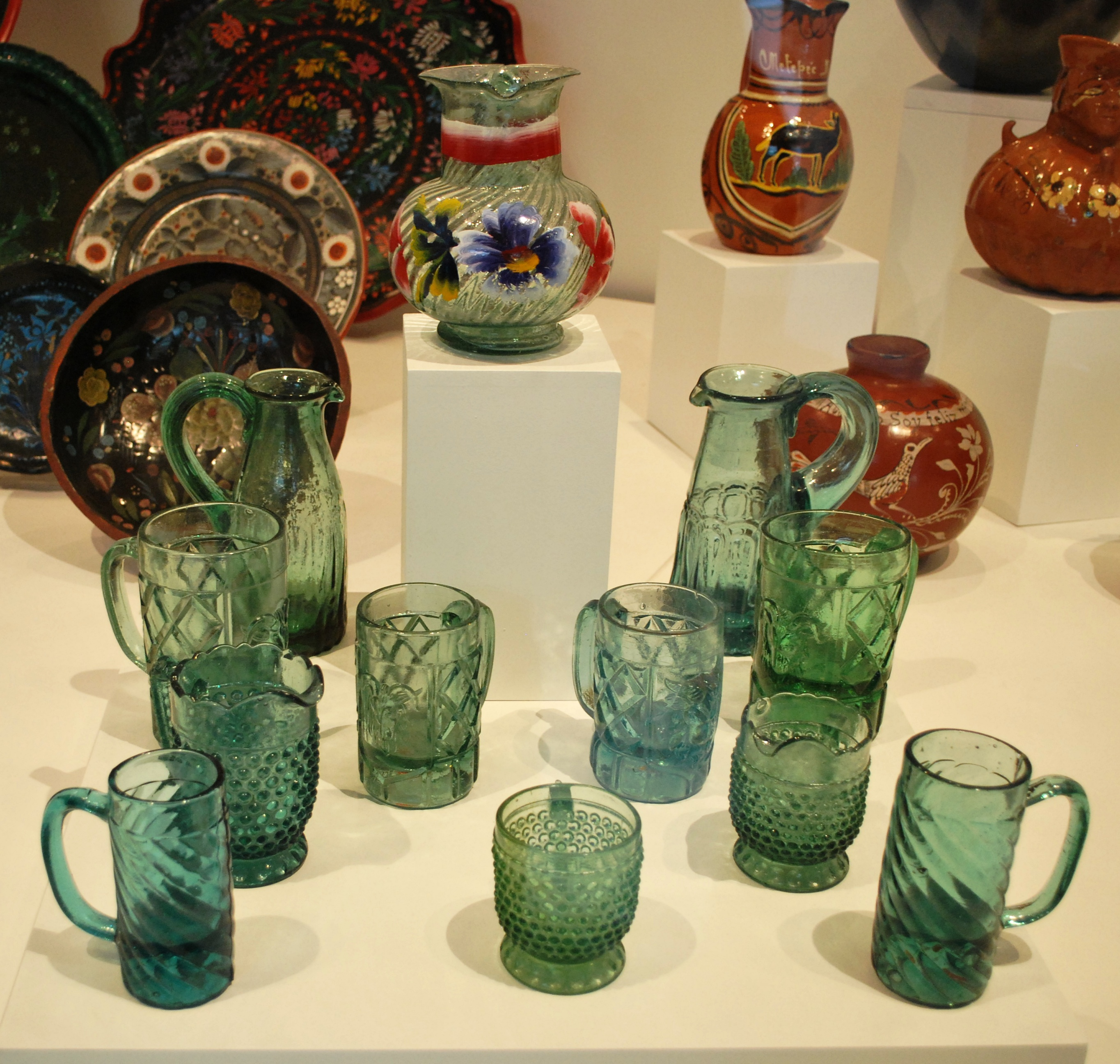
Traditional glassware for pulque circa 1950 on display at the Museo de Artes Populares, Mexico City

Drinking glasses have colorful names and can reflect a customer's ability to drink pulque. Large two-liter glasses are called macetas (flower pots), one-liter glasses are called cañones (cannons), half-liter glasses are called chivitos (little goats), quarter-liter glasses are catrinas (dandies), and eighth-liter glasses are tornillos (screws). Traditionally, these glasses are made from a greenish, hand-blown glass. People can drink pulque straight from the barrel or with additives such as fruit or nuts. Pulque prepared this way is called curado (cured).

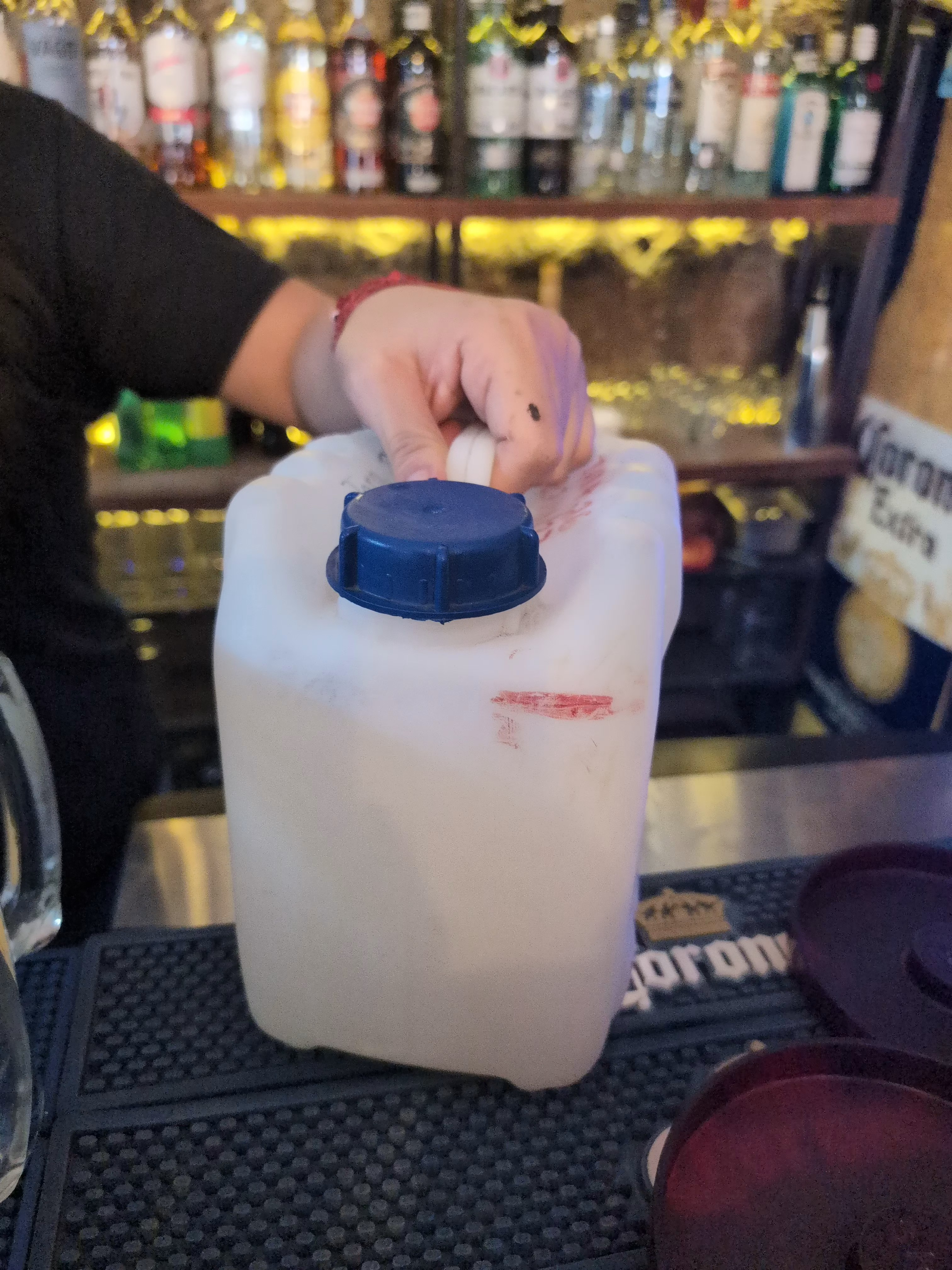
Pulque in a plastic jug at a cantina in Guadalajara, Mexico.

One limitation to pulque's popularity has been its inability to store for long periods or ship long distances. Recently, pulque makers have found a way to preserve the beverage in cans, but they admit this does change the flavor. The aspiration is that this innovation will help pulque regain its lost market in Mexico and even succeed as an export, like tequila. Boulder Imports already offers it in the United States under the brand "Nectar del Razo". The original market was Mexican-American men, but the company reports the product is having success as a health food, sought out by athletes and bodybuilders.

A pulqueria (pulque bar) on Plaza Garibaldi in Mexico City (2007)

== Nutritional value ==
A saying goes that pulque "sólo le falta un grado para ser carne" ("it is only a bit shy of being meat"), referring to the drink's purported nutritional value. Mesoamericans let pregnant women and the elderly drink what was normally reserved for priests and nobility. Modern analysis has found that the liquid contains carbohydrates; vitamin C, B-complex, D, and E; and amino acids and minerals such as iron and phosphorus.

== Pulque tourism ==
In its glory days, the state of Hidalgo had about 250 pulque haciendas, many of which have been abandoned or converted to other uses, such as ranching. Their tinacals have either disappeared or been converted into storage or party rooms. A few remaining ones still make pulque, but use more modern, sanitary facilities. In Tlaxcala, the federal Secretariat of Tourism and the state government have organized a tour called the "Pulque Route", which includes the main haciendas that still make the beverage in this state. The two-day route begins at the Church of La Barca de la Fe in Calpulalpan and ends at the San Bartolo Hacienda, the principal exporter of canned pulque. Ignacio Torres Adalid, known as the "king of pulque," owned this hacienda. Today, Ricardo del Razo owns it. The tour also covers maguey fields like those around a town called Guillermo Ramirez.

These old haciendas varied widely. Some were ostentatious, with strong architectural harmony, such as the Montecillos Hacienda, a Spanish colonial-style estate the Jesuits built in the 17th century, or the San Antonio Ometusco Hacienda, built by architect Antonio Rivas Mercado. However, most haciendas resulted from construction processes that began in the 16th century, blending architectural styles and methods from Mexico and Europe. One characteristic feature is Neo-Gothic towers. The Santiago Tetlapayac Hacienda has murals related to charreada and attributed to the painter Icaza. The Zotoluca Hacienda has an octagonal floor plan in Neo-Moorish style and was restored in the 1950s. But the tinacal sits at the center of each pulque hacienda. They were planned and decorated befitting their importance. Almost all have interesting architectural details, such as a specially decorated main doorway, murals, or sculpted windows. Some are considered works of art, such as the tinacal at Montecillos Hacienda or the one at San Antonio Ometusco Hacienda, which also has an elegant canopy covering the shipping dock, with molded iron columns and walls decorated with murals related to pulque history.

== Popular culture ==
During the 1930s, German filmmakers traveled to the town of Apan to make the 1936 documentary Pulquebereitung in Mexiko (translated into Spanish as La producción del pulque en México), directed by Hubert Schonger, which addressed the history of pulque. In fact, Adolf Hitler himself commissioned the film because he was interested in the drink and its health benefits. However, this documentary, along with other films, was lost for almost 70 years after the end of World War II until it was found at the Berlin Cultural Center and later purchased by pulque collector Javier Gómez Marín.

Awareness of pulque grew after the release of the 1966 film The Appaloosa. In the film, Matt Fletcher (Marlon Brando) is sitting in a cantina enjoying a pulque.

In season 1 episode 3 of the 2025 Netflix series Serpientes y Escaleras (English: Snakes and Ladders), Tiño (Benny Emmanuel) goes to an openly LGBTQ disco-like Pulquería with Juana (Loreto Peralta) and Nicolás (Germán Bracco), where they order pulque.

== See also ==
- Agave nectar
- Cauim
- Chicha
- Palm toddy
- Tepoztecatl
