= El Tepozteco National Park =

National park in Mexico

- IUCN category II (national park)
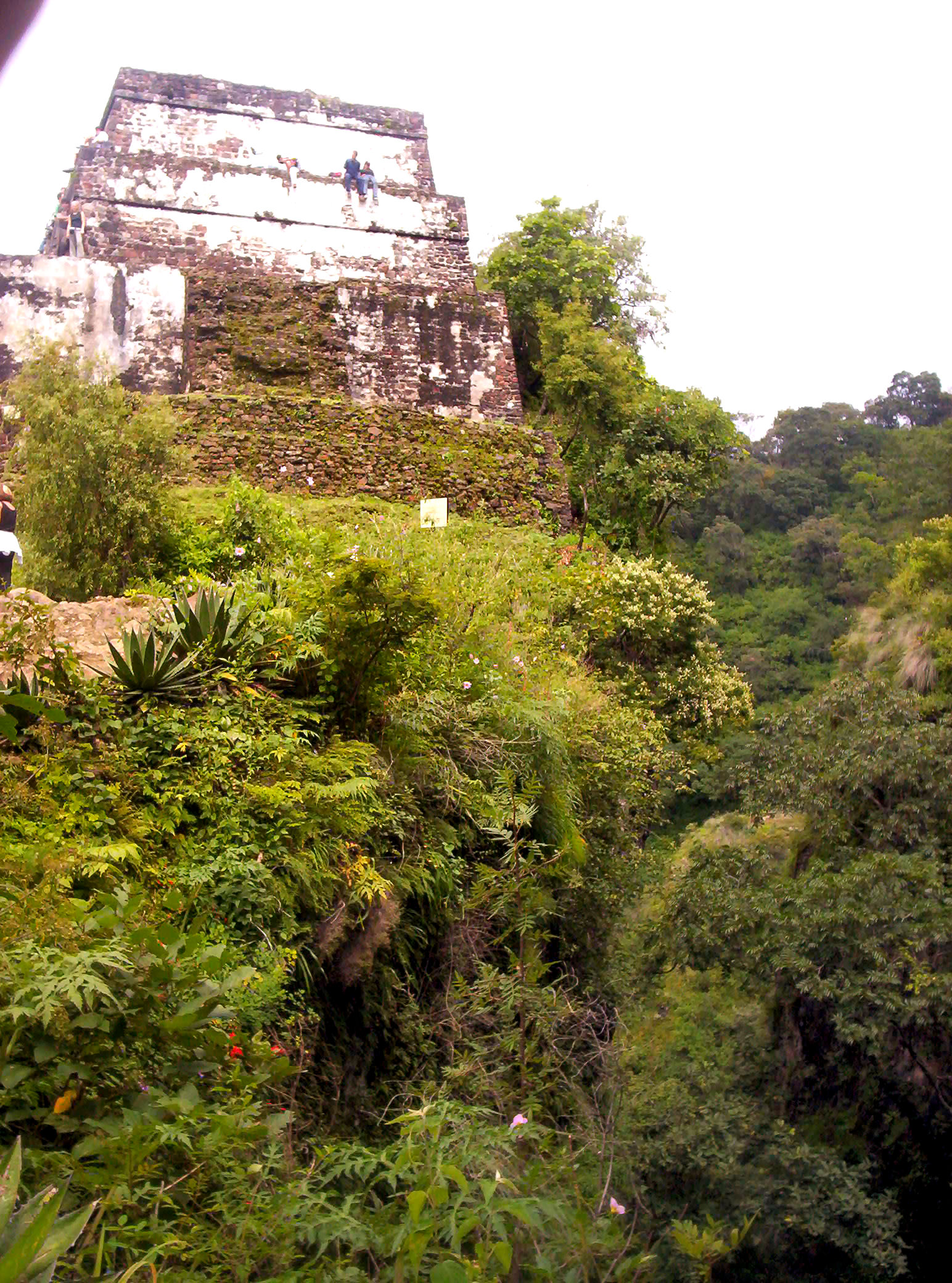
- El Tepozteco temple

- Location within Mexico
- Location: Morelos and Federal District, Mexico
- Nearest city: Cuernavaca and Mexico City
- Coordinates: 18°58′N 99°07′W
- Area: 23,258.70 ha (89.8023 sq mi)
- Designation: National park
- Designated: 1937
- Administrator: National Commission of Natural Protected Areas

El Tepozteco National Park is a national park in Morelos state of central Mexico. It protects 232.58 km^{2} in the mountains of the Trans-Mexican Volcanic Belt. The park includes El Tepozteco, an archeological site featuring an Aztec temple.

== Geography ==
El Tepozteco National Park covers the central portion of the Sierra Chichinautzin, a volcanic field which separates the Valley of Mexico to the north from the Balsas Basin to the south. Chichinautzin Volcano (3490 m), the highest peak in the park, is at the park's northwest corner. The Sierra de Tepoztlán is closer to the center of the park, immediately north of the town of Tepoztlán. The terrain is mostly steep, ranging from 1200 to 3480 meters elevation. The volcanic field is relatively recent – Chichinautzin Volcano's last major eruption was approximately 1800 years ago – and the park's landscape includes cinder cones and lava flows.

Most of the park is in the state of Morelos, in Tepoztlán municipality. The northern portion of the park extends into the Federal District. Mexico City lies to the north in the Valley of Mexico, and Cuernavaca is to the south. The park's forests and the porous volcanic deposits that underlie the park are important for replenishing the watersheds and groundwater aquifers which provide fresh water to Mexico City and Cuernavaca.

The park is ecologically integrated into the Chichinautzin Biological Corridor Flora and Fauna Protection Area, which borders the eastern and western sectors of the park and constitutes a strategic ecological corridor for central Mexico.

== Climate ==
The climate ranges from warm subhumid at lower elevations to temperate subhumid at higher elevations. Mean annual temperature is 18 C or more at lower elevations, 12–18 °C at middle elevations (2400–2800 meters), and 5–12 °C at high elevations. Mean annual rainfall ranges from 800 to 1200 mm, generally higher at higher elevations.

== Biodiversity ==
El Tepozteco National Park forms part of the ecological corridor known as the Forest of Water, one of the priority regions for water capture and aquifer recharge in central Mexico. Due to its complex topography and altitudinal gradient, the park contains diverse vegetation types, including pine forest, oak forest, tropical dry forest, and remnants of montane cloud forest.

According to records from the National Commission for the Knowledge and Use of Biodiversity (CONABIO), more than 2,600 species of flora and fauna have been documented within the protected area, including endemic species and organisms classified under risk categories established by NOM-059-SEMARNAT-2010

== Flora and fauna ==
El Tepozteco National Park is home to several plant communities, which vary with elevation and rainfall. Tropical dry deciduous forests are found at elevations up to 1600 meters in the southern part of the park, part of the Balsas dry forests ecoregion. Most of the park is in the Trans-Mexican Volcanic Belt pine–oak forests ecoregion. Pine–oak forests with juniper and juniper forests extend from 1600 to 2800 meters elevation. Pine forests are predominant above 2800 meters, with pine–fir and fir forests above 3000 meters. Pockets of montane cloud forest occur on steep slopes and canyons with year-round moisture and frequent cloud cover.

126 bird species have been recorded in the park, 42 of which are endemic to Mexico. Limited-range species include banded quail (Philortyx fasciatus), dusky hummingbird (Phaeoptila sordida), Boucard's wren (Campylorhynchus jocosus), long-tailed wood partridge (Dendrortyx macroura), black-chested sparrow (Peucaea humeralis), and the endangered Sierra Madre sparrow (Xenospiza baileyi). 35 mammal species have been recorded, including three endemic to Mexico.

There are 27 reptile species in the park, including 19 endemic to Mexico. Native reptiles include the Mexican beaded lizard (Heloderma horridum) and three limited-range rattlesnakes, the Mexican lance-headed rattlesnake (Crotalus polystictus), Central Mexican pygmy rattlesnake (Crotalus ravus), and Cross-banded mountain rattlesnake (Crotalus transversus). Native amphibians include the dwarf Mexican tree frog (Tlalocohyla smithii) Craugastor hobartsmithi, Craugastor vocalis, Eleutherodactylus nitidus, and Mexican cascades frog (Lithobates pustulosus).

== Conservation ==
President Lázaro Cárdenas established the park by decree on 22 January 1937.

The park is divided into zones for preservation, recuperation, traditional use, and human settlements.

The preservation zone covers areas of the park with relatively intact and sensitive habitat, totaling 12,958.1 hectares. It includes the Tenexcalli and Barriga de Plata areas. Tenexcalli (10,031 ha) covers the northern portion of the park, and includes Chichinautzin Volcano.

The recuperation or restoration zone, known as El Texcal, includes 2,682.9 hectares in the southwestern portion of the park where the landscape has been significantly altered by past human activity. It lies between 1,400 and 1,950 meters elevation. Human activities are limited within the zone to allow the natural flora and fauna to recover.

The traditional use zone encompasses 6,496.6 hectares, where residents of the park are permitted the use of natural resources in ways which don't significantly degrade the landscape or ecology of the park. It includes the Atongo-Valle Sagrado Tombuco, Calamatlán, Ojuelos and Barbechos areas.

Approximately 40,000 live within the park boundaries, in the settlements of Santa Catarina, San Andrés de la Cal, Tepoztlán, San Juan Tlacotenco, Santo Domingo Ocotitlán, Amatlán de Quetzalcóatl, Villa Santiago Tepetlapa, and Acolapa. The eight settlements cover a combined area of 1,121.1 hectares.

== Governance and management ==
El Tepozteco National Park is administered by the National Commission of Natural Protected Areas (CONANP), the agency responsible for coordinating conservation actions, ecological restoration, environmental monitoring, and the regulation of public use within the protected area.

The management of the park involves the participation of local communities, ejidos, communal landholders, municipal authorities, and civil society organizations. Among the principal management challenges are urban expansion, forest fires, illegal land-use change, tourism pressure, and the conservation of ecological connectivity with other areas of the Bosque de Agua biological corridor.

== Socio-environmental conflicts ==
Since the mid-twentieth century, the territory of El Tepozteco National Park has been the site of tensions related to land tenure, forest exploitation, agricultural activities, and the urban expansion of Tepoztlán. The coexistence of agrarian communities, communal land systems, and federal conservation policies has generated disputes over land use and the environmental restrictions derived from the protection decree.

Over several decades, sectors of the local population have pointed out contradictions between the economic needs of communities and the limitations imposed by federal environmental regulations, particularly regarding land-use change and tourism-related activities.

In recent decades, the park has faced increasing socio-environmental conflicts linked to real estate expansion, mass tourism, and irregular construction within or near the protected natural area. Various environmental organizations and local residents have denounced urbanization processes associated with private residences, hotels, and tourism developments that place pressure on the mountain ecosystems.

Federal environmental authorities, including the Federal Attorney for Environmental Protection (PROFEPA), have carried out closures and sanctions against projects considered illegal within protected zones of the national park. Among the principal issues identified are habitat fragmentation, loss of forest cover, trail erosion, waste generation, and pressure on water resources.

Likewise, the increase in tourism in Tepoztlán has generated debates regarding the compatibility of recreational, spiritual, and commercial activities with the ecological conservation objectives of the park.
