= Sierra de Ajusco-Chichinauhtzin =

Mountain range located between Mexico City and the states of Morelos and Mexico

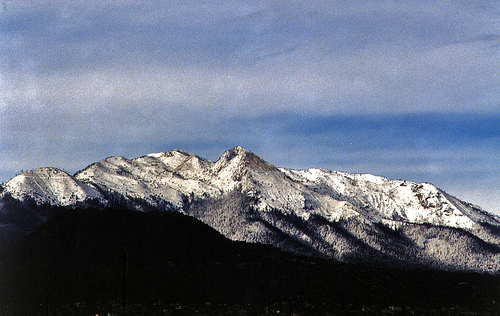
- View of the summits of Ajusco

Highest point
- Peak: Ajusco
- Elevation: 12,894 ft (3,930 m)

Naming
- Etymology: Spanish for mountain range
- Nickname: Serranía del Ajusco or Sierra de Chichinauhtzin

Geography
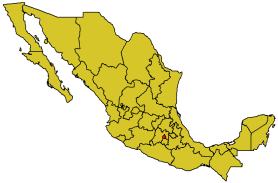
- Mexico City inside Mexico
- Country: Mexico
- States: Morelos and Mexico City

Geology
- Rock age: Quaternary period
- Rock types: batholith and igneous

The Sierra del Ajusco-Chichinauhtzin, (Ajusco-Chichinautzin Mountain Range) also known as Serranía del Ajusco or Sierra de Chichinauhtzin, is a Mexican mountain range located between Mexico City and the states of Morelos and Mexico. It makes up the southern part of the mountain necklace that surrounds Mexico City. It is made up of more than one hundred volcanic cones, among which are: Tláloc (3,690 metres (12,110 ft) MAMSL), Chichinauhtzin (3,430 metres (11,250 ft), Xitle (3,100 metres (10,200 ft), Cerro Pelado (3,600 metres (11,800 ft) and Cuauhtzin (3,510 metres (11,520 ft). Its maximum height is at the Cruz del Marqués peak on the Ajusco volcano (3,937 metres (12,917 ft)).

== Background ==
The range includes parts of the municipalities of Tlalpan, Xochimilco, Tláhuac, Milpa Alta and Magdalena Contreras on the south of Mexico City; the municipalities of Huitzilac, Tepoztlán and Tlalnepantla in Morelos; and the municipalities of Juchitepec and Tepetlixpa, in the State of Mexico. These mountains form the highest point as well as the southern limit of Mexico City, separating the Valley of Mexico from the Cuernavaca Valley and the Tepozteco mountain range.

The range emerged during the Quaternary period, with intense volcanic activity that closed the lacustrine basin of Mexico, depriving it of its only natural drainage towards the Balsas river basin. Ajusco is part of the geological subprovince of the lakes and volcanoes of the Anahuac, located within the Trans-Mexican Volcanic Belt.

== Environment ==
The range is home to the Cumbres del Ajusco National Park, and the area is part of the Ajusco Chichinautzin Biological Corridor.

The area has diverse habitats and species due to its unique geographic and climatic conditions. There are 315 species of fungi, 10 species of amphibians, 43 species of reptiles, 1,348 species of insects and spiders, 237 of birds (36 exclusive to this region), 5 species of fish, 785 of plants, and 7 types of vegetation in addition to forests of pine, oyamel and oak.

== See also ==
- Sierra Chichinautzin
