= Crotalus lugubris =

Crotalus lugubris (a taxonomic synonym) may refer to:

- Crotalus aquilus, a.k.a. the Querétaro dusky rattlesnake, a venomous pitviper species found in the highlands of central Mexico
- Crotalus polystictus, a.k.a. the Mexican lance-headed rattlesnake, a venomous pitviper species found in central Mexico
- Crotalus triseriatus, a.k.a. the dusky rattlesnake, a venomous pitviper species found in Mexico
