= Sierra de Tepoztlán =

Mountain located Morelos, Mexico

Coordinates: 19°0′3.28″N 99°6′4.19″W

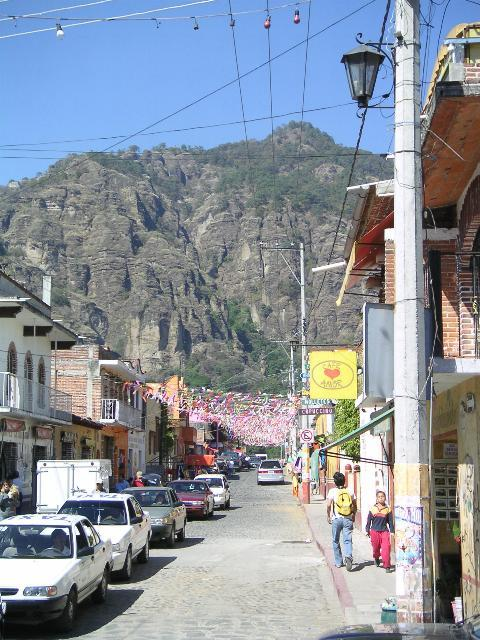
View of the mountain from the town of Tepoztlán.

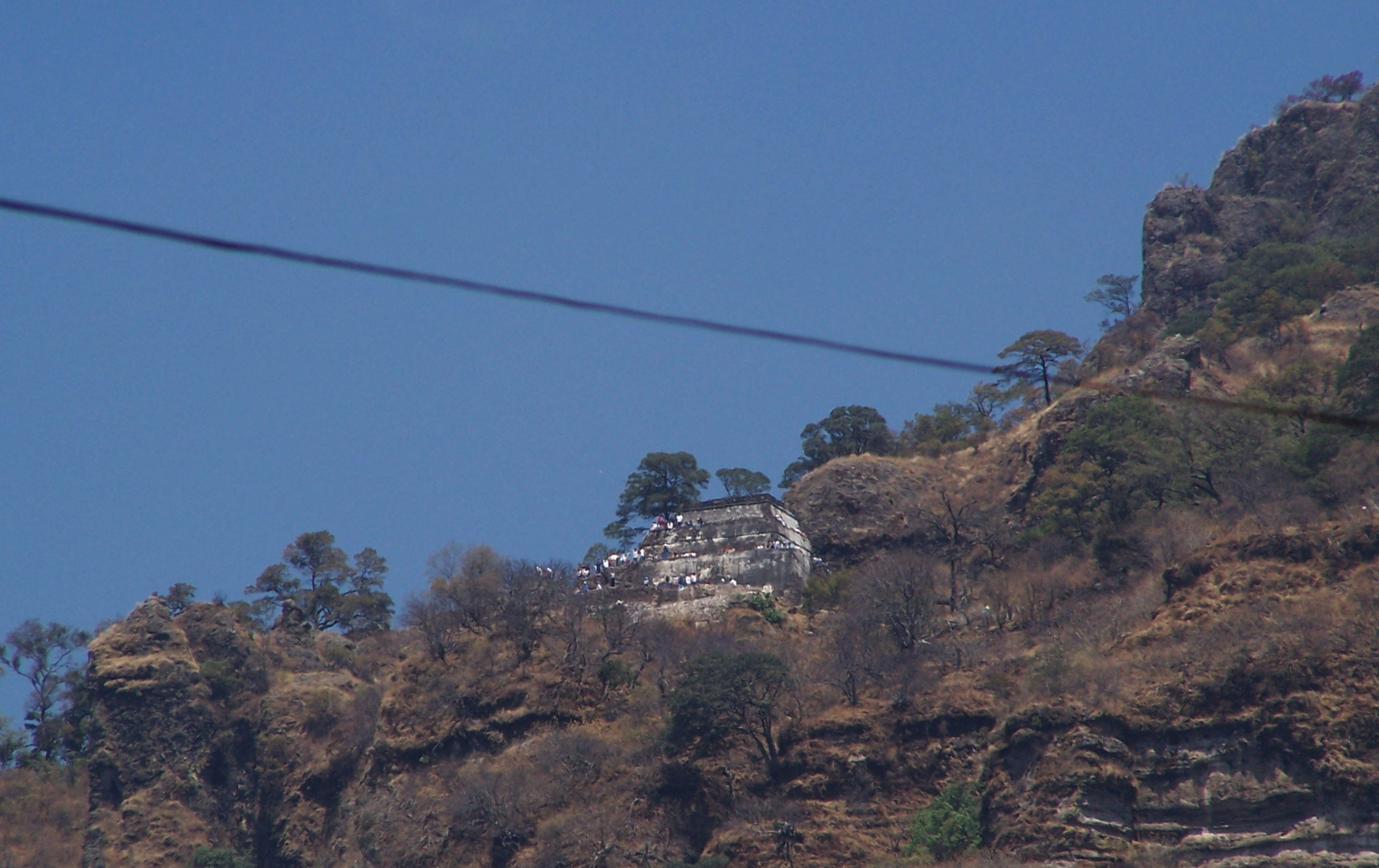
View of El Tepozteco

Sierra de Tepoztlán or Tepozteco Mountain is located near the village of Tepoztlán, a Pueblo Mágico, in Morelos, Mexico. The mountain range, "vulnerable to landslides, erosions, and flooding", contains only small areas of land which are appropriate for cultivation. It contains the ruins of a small, pre-Hispanic, Ometochtli temple, known as El Tepozteco. It is believed that there were a number of settlements at one time at the mountain base.

The Sierra is in El Tepozteco National Park, which was established in 1937.

== Bibliography ==
- Deane, Zain (9 September 2011). Explorer's Guide Mexico City, Puebla & Cuernavaca: A Great Destination (Explorer's Great Destinations). Countryman Press. ISBN 978-1-58157-900-0.
- Lomnitz, Claudio (2001). Deep Mexico, Silent Mexico: An Anthropology of Nationalism. University of Minnesota Press. ISBN 978-0-8166-3289-3.
- Marcos, Sylvia (2010). Women and Indigenous Religions. ABC-CLIO. ISBN 978-0-275-99157-9.
- Sawyer, Maria Lennartsson; Kvarnström, Elisabeth; Lundberg, Tommy (2009). Comparing Sanitation Systems Using Sustainability Criteria. EcoSanRes Programme. ISBN 978-91-86125-12-7.
