= Cumbres del Ajusco National Park =

National park in Mexico

- IUCN category II (national park)
- Location within Mexico
- Location: Tlalpan / Magdalena Contreras, Mexico City, Mexico
- Coordinates: 19.21512°N 99.25639°W
- Area: 920 hectares (2,300 acres)
- Established: May 23, 1936
- Governing body: Secretariat of the Environment and Natural Resources

Cumbres del Ajusco National Park is one of many national parks near Mexico City. The Ajusco is known for its high elevations reaching 3,900 metres (12,800 ft) above sea level and is visible from any part of Mexico city. The park is characterized by pine-oak forests and high mountain grassland. Cumbres del Ajusco means "watered grove peaks", an appropriate name for this mountainous region covered with lush green forest with many flowers due to a fair amount of precipitation. The Balsas and Lerma rivers begin in the heart of the Cumbres del Ajusco.

This range accounts for approximately half of the area of the Mexican Federal District, the rest of which is occupied by Mexico City. The area is key to the conservation of the ecosystem, and is important to endemic species. Urbanization of Mexico city has posed several environmental concerns over the preservation of the habitats and ecosystems of the park.

== History ==
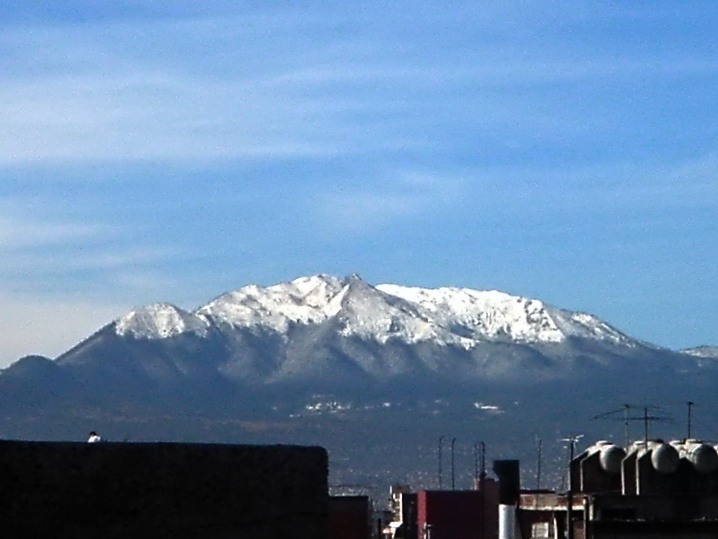
View of the Cumbres del Ajusco from Mexico City

The Cumbres del Ajusco has attracted humans since approximately 1200 BC; Otomíes are thought to have been the first to inhabit the Ajusco area. During the pre-Columbian Era, an area now known as Tlalpan was inhabited by natives known as Tepanecas along the San Buenaventura River.

During the 17th century, the Viceroyalty of New Spain made it a state policy to find all rural indigenous populations living in the mountainous areas of the Cumbres del Ajusco., and resettle them in a smaller area so that they could be converted to Christianity. Today there still remains many old Spanish missions and churches along the edge of the Cumbres del Ajusco.

Cumbres del Ajusco National Park was created by decree on September 23, 1936, by the Mexican federal government. The park was later expanded to its current state of 920 hectares (3.6 sq mi) on May 19, 1947.

== Geography ==
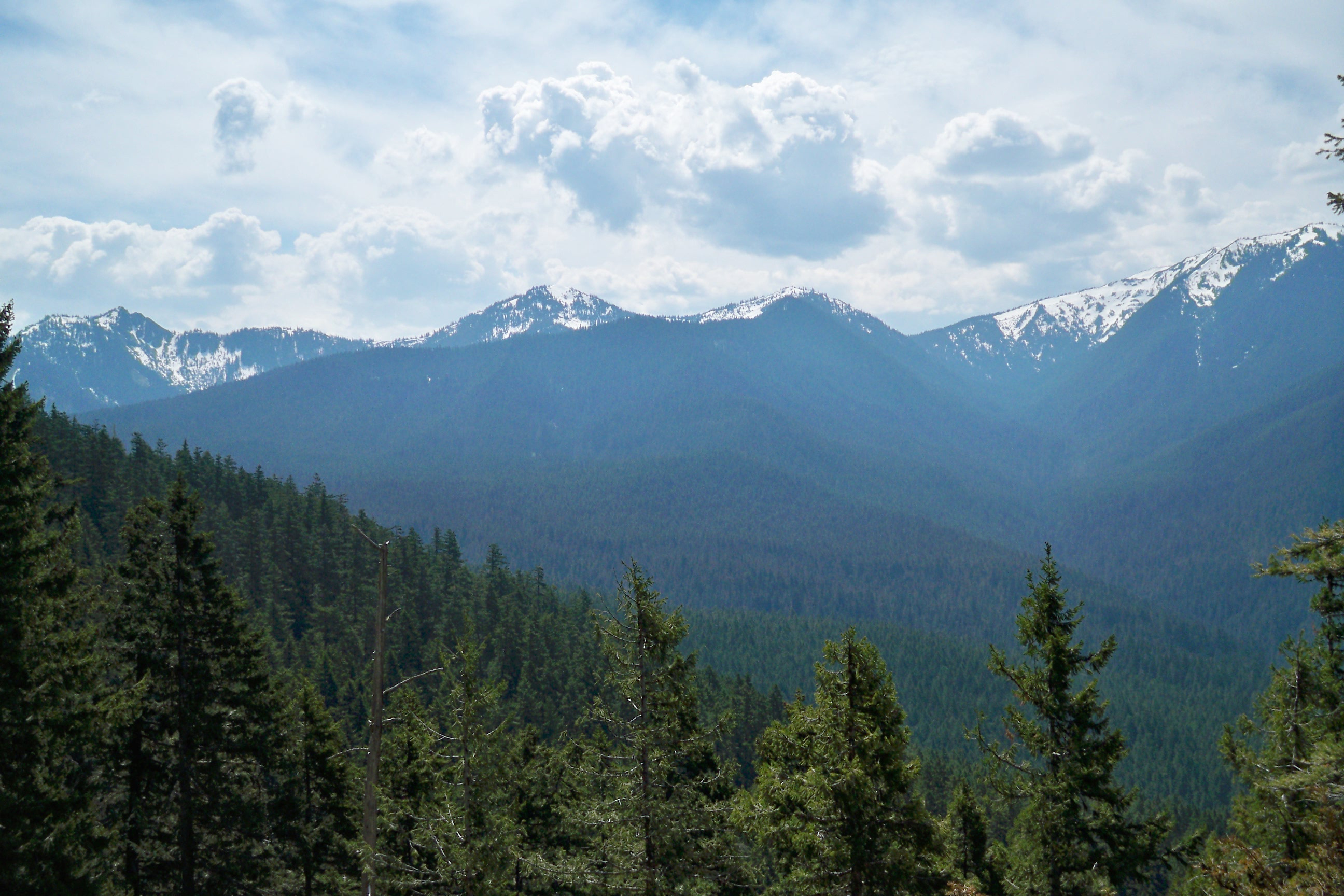
Winter in the Cumbres del Ajusco

Cumbres del Ajusco National Park is one of many national parks near Mexico City. The park is known for its high elevations reaching 3,900 meters (12,800 ft) above sea level which are part of the Sierra de Ajusco-Chichinauhtzin mountain range. All of the mountain systems in the area are part of the Cordillera Neovolcanica that crosses the center part of Mexico. Cerro La Cruz del Marqués towers 1,400 meters (4,600 ft) above Mexico City and is the highest peak within the park reaching 3,930 meters above sea level.

The Highest Peaks in the Cumbres del Ajusco National Park

- Cruz del Marqués: 3,930 m (12,890 ft) above sea level
- Pico del Águila: 3,880 m (12,730 ft) above sea level
- Santo Tomás: 3,710 m (12,170 ft) above sea level
- Mezontepec: 3,480 m (11,420 ft) above sea level

The park also includes part of the Valley of Mexico bordering the Tlalpan borough of Mexico City. The park is characterized by pine-oak forests and high mountain grassland. Cumbres del Ajusco means "watered grove peaks", an appropriate name for this mountainous region covered with lush green forest with many flowers due to a fair amount of precipitation. The Balsas River and Lerma River begin in the heart of the Cumbres del Ajusco.

The mountains are constituted of perforated volcanic rock inhibiting surface rivers to form, but there are many subterranean rivers that feed fresh water springs in the lower areas of the park and in the surrounding valleys. The best known springs are Xochimilco Springs, Nativitas Springs, and Las Fuentes Brotantes. Xochimilco Springs are important water source for Mexico City. The Sierra de Ajusco-Chichinauhtzin is part a mountainous forest area known as the Gran Bosque de Agua (Great Water Forest) because it meets the demands of one of the largest population centers in the world located in Central Mexico.

== Climate ==
There are three different climate zones in the park according to the Köppen climate classification: the Cwb subtropical highland climate zone, with a wet season during summer and a winter dry-season, occurring at elevations under 2,000 meters. From 2,000 meters to 3,000 meters the Cfc upper subtropical highland climate is present, it is characterized by year round precipitation somewhat fairly distributed, although usually only the summer months carry truly heavy rains. And finally the Tropical Alpine tundra which is found at elevations of 3,000 meters or higher. Deforestation heavily affects the upper slopes, therefore the artificially created "tundra" continues to expand. Snow may be present during the winter months. Average annual temperature of the Ajusco is 13 °C (55 °F) with extreme temperatures rising to 26 °C (79 °F) in lower elevations and falling to −4 °C (25 °F) in elevations higher than 3, 000 meters.

Climate data for Cumbres del Ajusco National Park, elev. 2,990 metres (9,810 ft)
Month	Jan	Feb	Mar	Apr	May	Jun	Jul	Aug	Sep	Oct	Nov	Dec	Year
Record high °C (°F)	27.5 (81.5)	28.0 (82.4)	31.0 (87.8)	31.0 (87.8)	31.5 (88.7)	32.5 (90.5)	29.5 (85.1)	28.0 (82.4)	27.0 (80.6)	27.0 (80.6)	27.0 (80.6)	27.0 (80.6)	32.5 (90.5)
Mean daily maximum °C (°F)	14.9 (58.8)	14.6 (58.3)	15.7 (60.3)	16.1 (61.0)	16.5 (61.7)	15.9 (60.6)	15.4 (59.7)	15.2 (59.4)	14.9 (58.8)	15.3 (59.5)	15.3 (59.5)	15.3 (59.5)	15.4 (59.7)
Daily mean °C (°F)	9.1 (48.4)	9.2 (48.6)	10.1 (50.2)	10.4 (50.7)	10.9 (51.6)	10.8 (51.4)	10.5 (50.9)	10.3 (50.5)	10.2 (50.4)	9.9 (49.8)	9.5 (49.1)	9.4 (48.9)	10.0 (50.0)
Mean daily minimum °C (°F)	3.2 (37.8)	3.7 (38.7)	4.4 (39.9)	4.7 (40.5)	5.3 (41.5)	5.6 (42.1)	5.5 (41.9)	5.5 (41.9)	5.5 (41.9)	4.5 (40.1)	3.7 (38.7)	3.5 (38.3)	4.6 (40.3)
Record low °C (°F)	−11.5 (11.3)	−9.0 (15.8)	−8.0 (17.6)	−6.5 (20.3)	−5.5 (22.1)	−5.0 (23.0)	0.0 (32.0)	−1.5 (29.3)	−4.5 (23.9)	−9.0 (15.8)	−10.5 (13.1)	−8.0 (17.6)	−11.5 (11.3)
Average precipitation mm (inches)	14.7 (0.58)	7.7 (0.30)	19.9 (0.78)	51.1 (2.01)	82.2 (3.24)	219.0 (8.62)	267.8 (10.54)	281.9 (11.10)	232.7 (9.16)	91.0 (3.58)	15.6 (0.61)	7.5 (0.30)	1,291.1 (50.83)
Average precipitation days (≥ 0.1 mm)	1.5	1.2	2.2	5.5	10.0	17.2	21.8	21.8	19.3	10.2	2.7	1.3	114.7
Source: Servicio Meteorológico National

== Flora and fauna ==
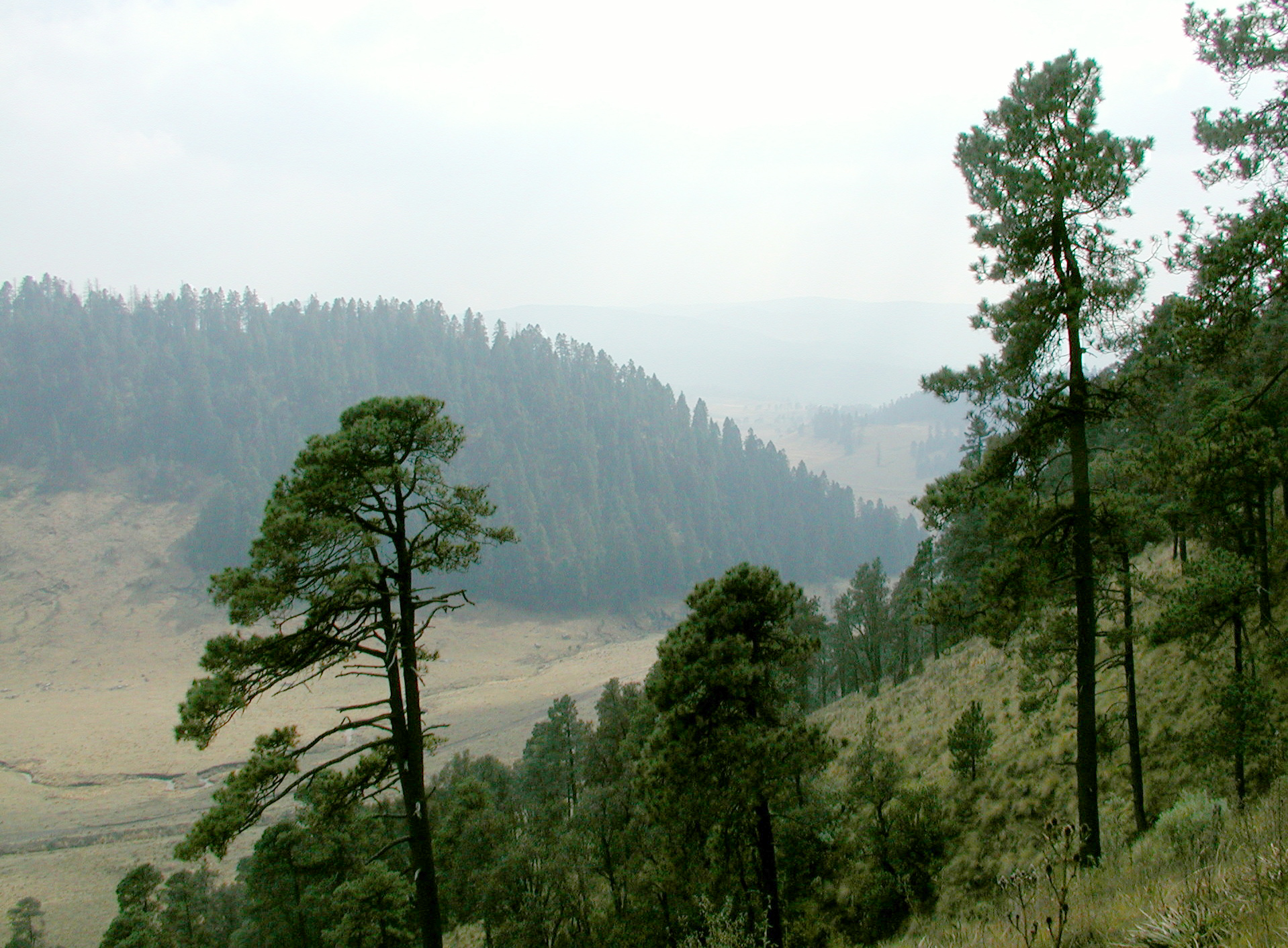
Pinus hartwegii one of the many coniferous species in the Ajusco

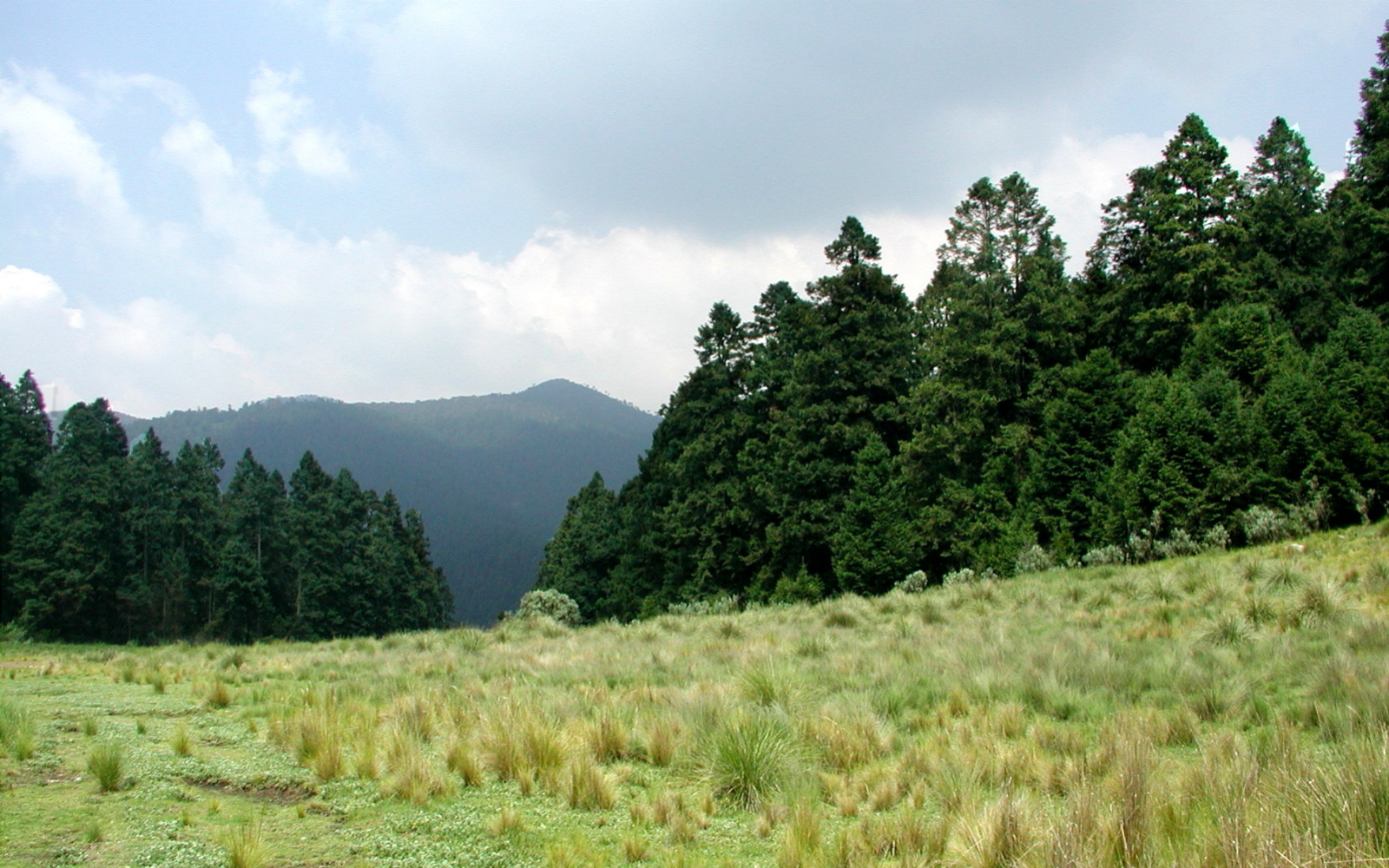
Abies religiosa sacred tree in the mountainous forest of Mexico.

Even though the park is considered an area in jeopardy of being negatively affected by urban expansion, the Cumbres del Ajusco has a great diversity of flora and fauna endemic to Cordillera Neovolcanica that goes through the center of Mexico. The park consists primarily of various species of trees from the following genera: Pinus, Abies, Quercus, Juniperus, and Arbutus. Throughout the park the fauna changes due to various physical geographic features like: elevation, steep slopes (with differences in facing direction), canyons, and valleys.

Abies religiosa, locally known as oyamel from Náhuatl origin, is one of the many Abies species located in the park. At altitudes between 2,700 and 3,500 meters (8,900 and 11,500 ft) above sea level, Abies are the most abundant; Abies grow most proficiently in rich organic soils with abundant moisture all year. The pine forests are most common at elevations between 2,350 and 4,000 meters (7,710 and 13,120 ft); the most common Pinus species are: Pinus leiophylla, Pinus montezumae, Pinus rudis, Pinus teocote, and Pinus hartwegii. Pinus hartwegii is one of the Pinus species that have become endangered.

The following oak species are the most common in the park: Quercus rugosa, Quercus laeta, Quercus laurina, Quercus deserticola, and Quercus crassipes. Junipers can be found in open species in gentle slopes and lower elevations like in some valleys.

The park's fauna consists of many mammals like: bats, shrew, opossum, volcano rabbit, squirrel, least weasel, skunk, coyote, and bobcat. There are three common snake species in the park: milk snake, rattlesnake, and plain-bellied water snake.

The bird species in the park sometimes have been known to feed in the Mexico City metropolitan area due to its proximity to the park. The main bird species observed in the park are: house sparrow, barn swallow, lark, woodpecker, blue jay, black vulture, and golden eagle.

== Gallery ==
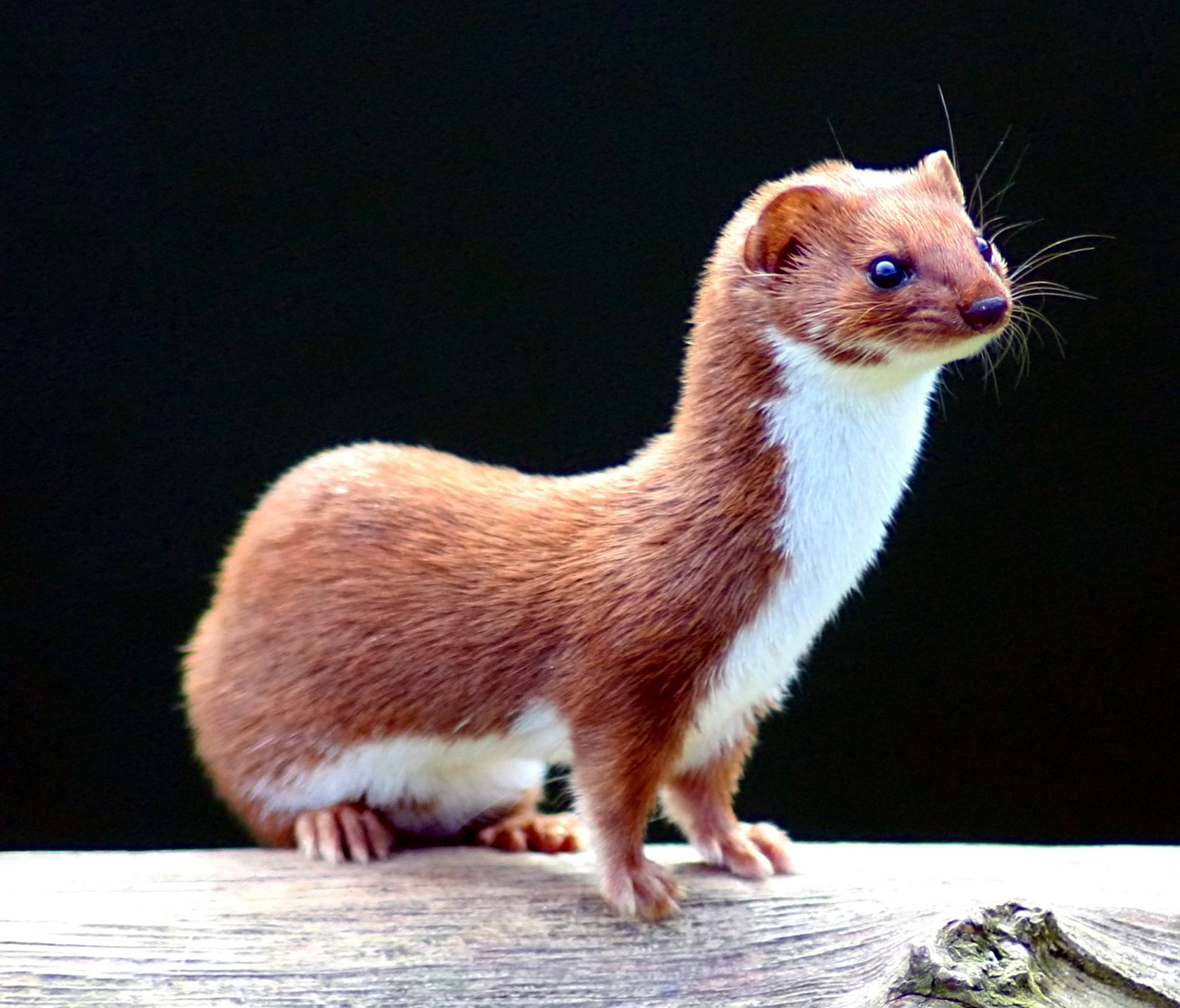
Least weasel

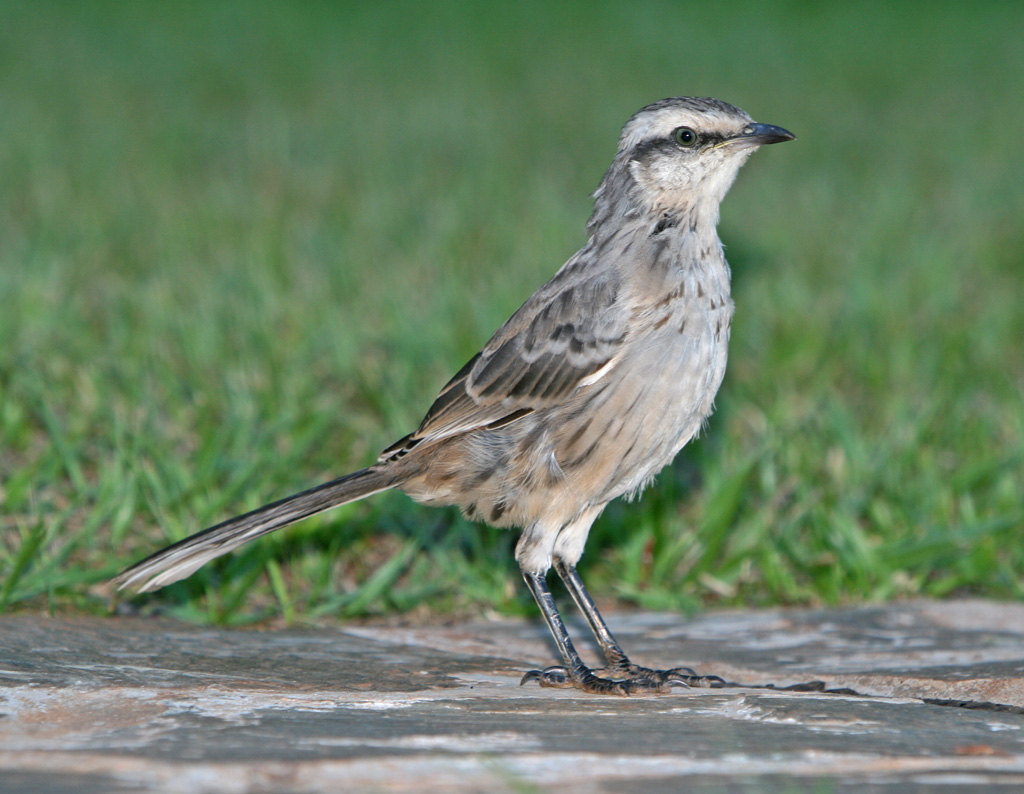
Chalk-browed mockingbird

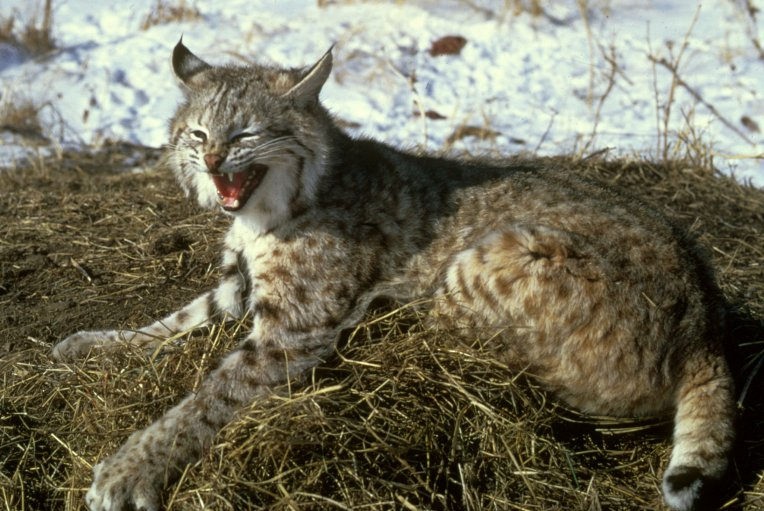
Bobcat

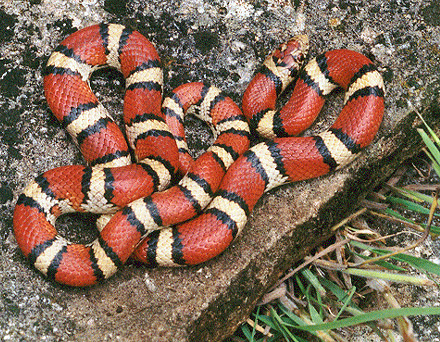
Milk snake
