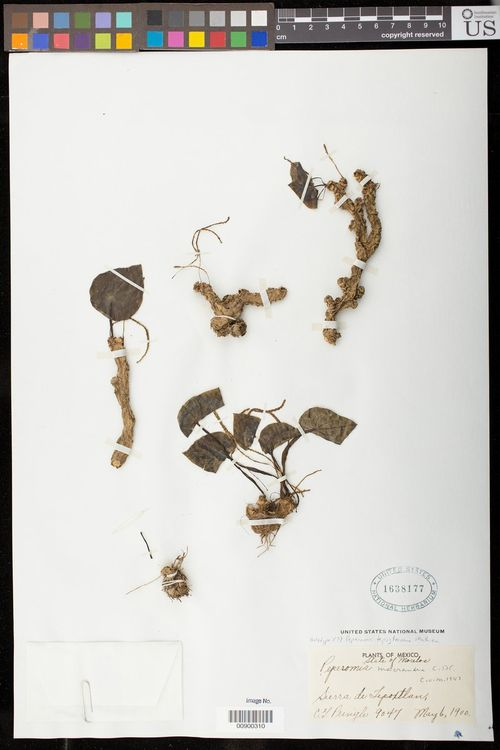

Scientific classification
- Kingdom: Plantae
- Clade: Tracheophytes
- Clade: Angiosperms
- Clade: Magnoliids
- Order: Piperales
- Family: Piperaceae
- Genus: Peperomia
- Species: P. tepoztecoana

Binomial name
- Peperomia tepoztecoana G.Mathieu

= Peperomia tepoztecoana =

Species of flowering plant

Peperomia tepoztecoana is a species of tuberous geophyte in the genus Peperomia that is endemic in Mexico. It primarily grows on dry tropical biomes. Its conservation status is Threatened.

== Description ==
The first specimens where collected in Morelos, Mexico.

Peperomia tepoztecoana is a glabrous robust herb up to 25 cm tall in a vegetative state. Its tubers are 7 cm long and 3 cm wide. The tubers root at the base, with several contorted trunk-like outgrowths at the tip of the tuber reaching up to 18 cm long and 1 cm wide with distinct distal petiole scars. The leaves and inflorescences of the tuber are at the tip or body of the trucks. There are 1-10 leaves per plant. Its petioles on the leaves are 5-10 cm x 2-4 mm. The stamen is chartaceous and rarely orbicular up to 10 cm long and 7 cm wide. Its peltate is 1/4 - 1/3 of the leaf length from the base. The tip is obtuse. The base is rounded, 10-palmatinerved, glossy green to slightly whitish green adaxially. There are 1-10 spadices per plant, with its peduncles being 4-7 cm tall. The rachis are 7-12 cm tall densely flowered. Its floral bracts are orbicular to elliptic, with it being 0.8-1 mm long. The stems have filaments up to 0.4-0.7 mm long. The anthers are 0.4 mm long. The ovary is a long ellipsoid. It has a terminal stigma. The fruits is a 0.7-0.9 - 0.5-0.6 mm long ellipsoid that is shortly pedicellate.

This species resemble similar structures in Peperomia chutanka, but its species tend to be more numerous and more branched. The leaves of P. Chutanka are usually a little smaller and rather orbicular to elliptic than ovate, and differ in the violet abaxial side. The petiole in this species is widest at the base whereas it is widest at the tip in P. chutanka. The reticulate fruit of this species is not reported in P. chutanka. The latter species prefers exposed, dry rock walls where it occurs often together with lichens while this species prefers the shady rock walls of deep canyons.

== Taxonomy and Naming ==
It was described in 2011 by G.Mathieu in Revista Mexicana de Biodiversidad 82, from specimens collected by Cyrus Pringle. The epithet refers to El Tepozteco.

== Distribution and Habitat ==
It is endemic in Mexico. It grows on a geophyte environment and on dry tropical biomes.

== Phenology ==
The plant produces leaves between May and August. It is no longer flowering and fruiting in August.

== Conservation ==
This species is assessed as Threatened, in a preliminary report.
