= Chichinautzin Biological Corridor =

Protected natural area in central Mexico

- Corredor Biológico Chichinautzin
- IUCN category VI (protected area with sustainable use of natural resources)
- Location within Mexico
- Location: Morelos, Mexico
- Nearest city: Huitzilac
- Coordinates: 19°05′N 99°08′W
- Area: 319.05 km^{2} (123.19 sq mi)
- Designation: Flora and fauna protection area
- Designated: 1988
- Governing body: National Commission of Natural Protected Areas

The Chichinautzin Biological Corridor is a protected natural area in central Mexico. It is located south of Mexico City in the Sierra de Ajusco-Chichinauhtzin, an east–west chain of volcanic mountains which are part of the Trans-Mexican Volcanic Belt.

== Geography ==
The Chichinautzin Biological Corridor covers an area of 319.05 km^{2} in the northern portion of Morelos state, on the border with the State of Mexico. The corridor consists of two separate parts, which lie east and west of El Tepozteco National Park.

The western portion contains the volcanoes Cerro Chichinautzin (3,470 metres (11,380 ft)) and Cuatzin (3,510 metres (11,520 ft)). It is bounded on the west by Lagunas de Zempoala National Park and Zempoala–La Bufa Otomí-Mexica Ecological Park, on the north by San Miguel Topilejo Ecological Reserve, on the east by El Tepozeco National Park. The city of Cuernavaca lies to the south.

The eastern portion is bounded on the west by El Tepozeco National Park and on the northwest by Milpa Alta Protected Area.

== Flora and fauna ==
Pine-oak forests are the main plant community in the corridor, with species of pine, oak, and oyamel (fir) as the predominant trees.

The Chichinautzin Biological Corridor is a protected natural area with a remarkable diversity of habitats and species due to its geographic and climatic conditions. There are 785 species of plants, 315 species of fungi (more than 80 edible), 10 species of amphibians, 43 species of reptiles, 1,348 species of insects and spiders, 237 of birds (36 exclusive to this region), and 5 species of fish in the corridor. It is home to several limited-range species endemic to the mountains of Central Mexico, including the volcano rabbit (Romerolagus diazi), Mexican volcano mouse (Neotomodon alstoni), cross-banded mountain rattlesnake (Crotalus transversus), and mountain stream salamander (Ambystoma altamirani).

== Conservation ==
The Chichinautzin Biological Corridor was designated in 1988 to create a continuous protected area that connects Lagunas de Zempoala National Park with El Tepozteco National Park. The total area protected by the biological corridor and the two national parks is 660.92 km^{2}.
