= Sierra Chichinautzin =

Volcanic field in Mexico

Coordinates: 19.2°N 99.3°W

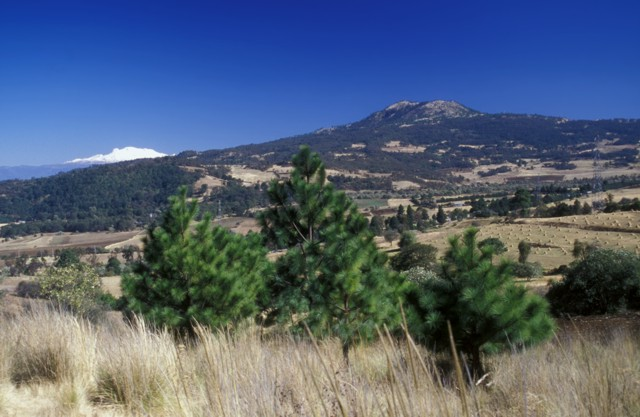
Cuauhtzin lava dome, of the Sierra Chichinautzin volcanic field.

The Sierra Chichinautzin volcanic field, also known as El Pedegral, is located in the Trans-Mexican Volcanic Belt, approximately 350 kilometres (220 mi) from where the Cocos Plate subducts beneath the North American Plate.

== Description ==
According to The Smithsonian Institution's Global Volcanism Program, "The massive Chichinautzin volcanic field covers a 90 kilometres (56 mi) long, East-West trending area immediately south of central Mexico City." It is located within the Trans-Mexican Volcanic Belt, and is less than 40 km directly south of Mexico City.

The Sierra Chichinautzin, formed primarily of overlapping small cinder cones and shield volcanoes, creates a broad topographic barrier at the southern end of the Basin of Mexico that extends from the eastern flank of Nevado de Toluca to the western flank of Iztaccihuatl volcano. The volcanic field contains more than 220 Pleistocene-to-Holocene monogenetic vents.

The best-known eruption occurred about 1670 radiocarbon years ago from the Xitle scoria cone, NE of the Volcán Ajusco lava-dome complex, which at 3,930 metres (12,890 ft) forms the highest peak of the Sierra Chichinautzin. The Xitle eruption produced a massive basaltic tube-fed lava flow that covered agricultural lands as well as pyramids and other structures of Cuicuilco and adjacent prehispanic urban centers.

The southern part of Mexico City and the National University of Mexico, in the greater El Pedegral district, lie atop the distal end of the 13 kilometres (8.1 mi) long lava flow.

== See also ==
- List of volcanoes in Mexico
- List of volcanic fields
- Sierra de Ajusco-Chichinauhtzin
