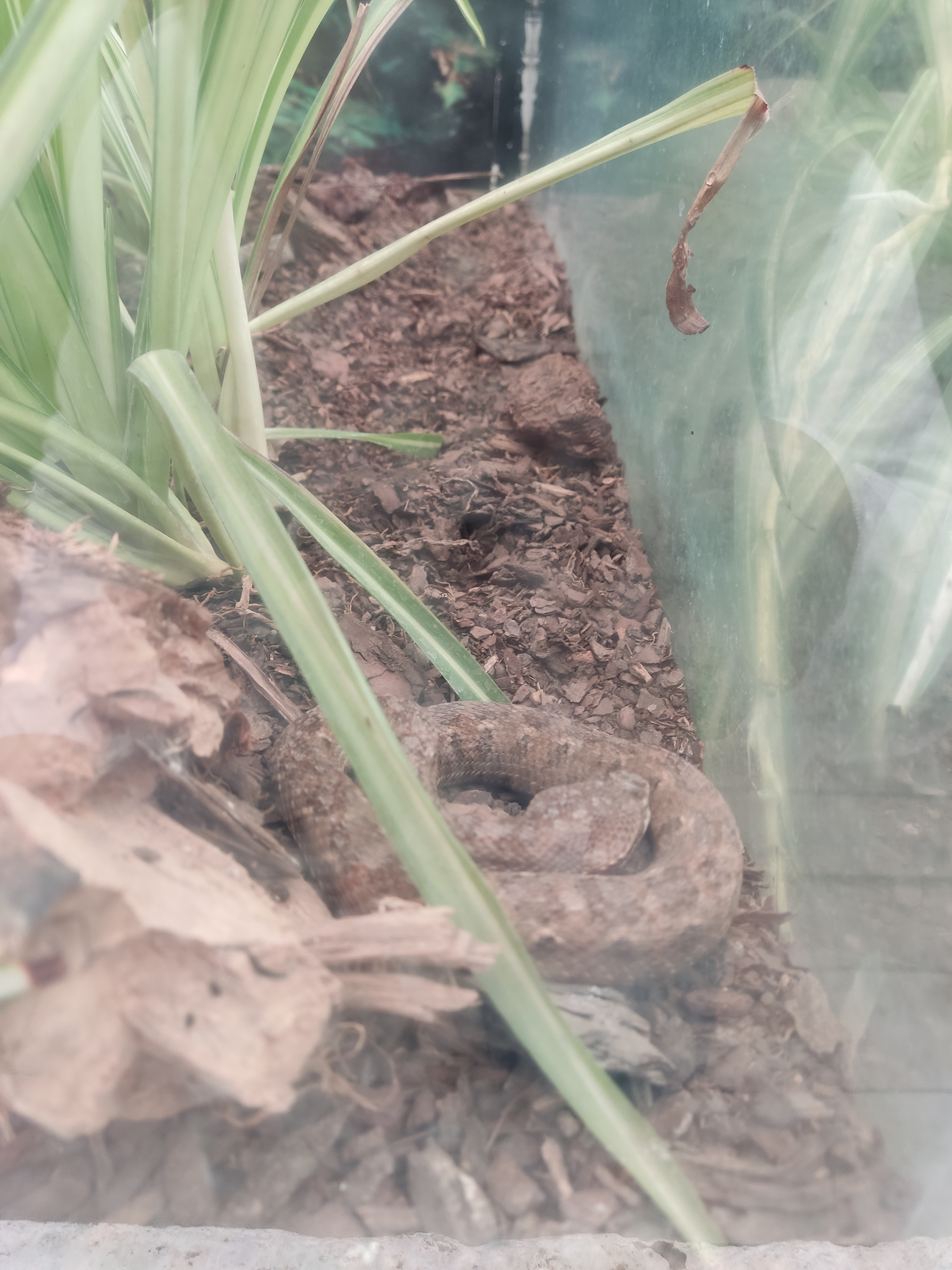
- Crotalus triseriatus in Morelia Zoo

Conservation status
- Least Concern (IUCN 3.1)

Scientific classification
- Kingdom: Animalia
- Phylum: Chordata
- Class: Reptilia
- Order: Squamata
- Suborder: Serpentes
- Family: Viperidae
- Genus: Crotalus
- Species: C. triseriatus

Binomial name
- Crotalus triseriatus (Wagler, 1830)
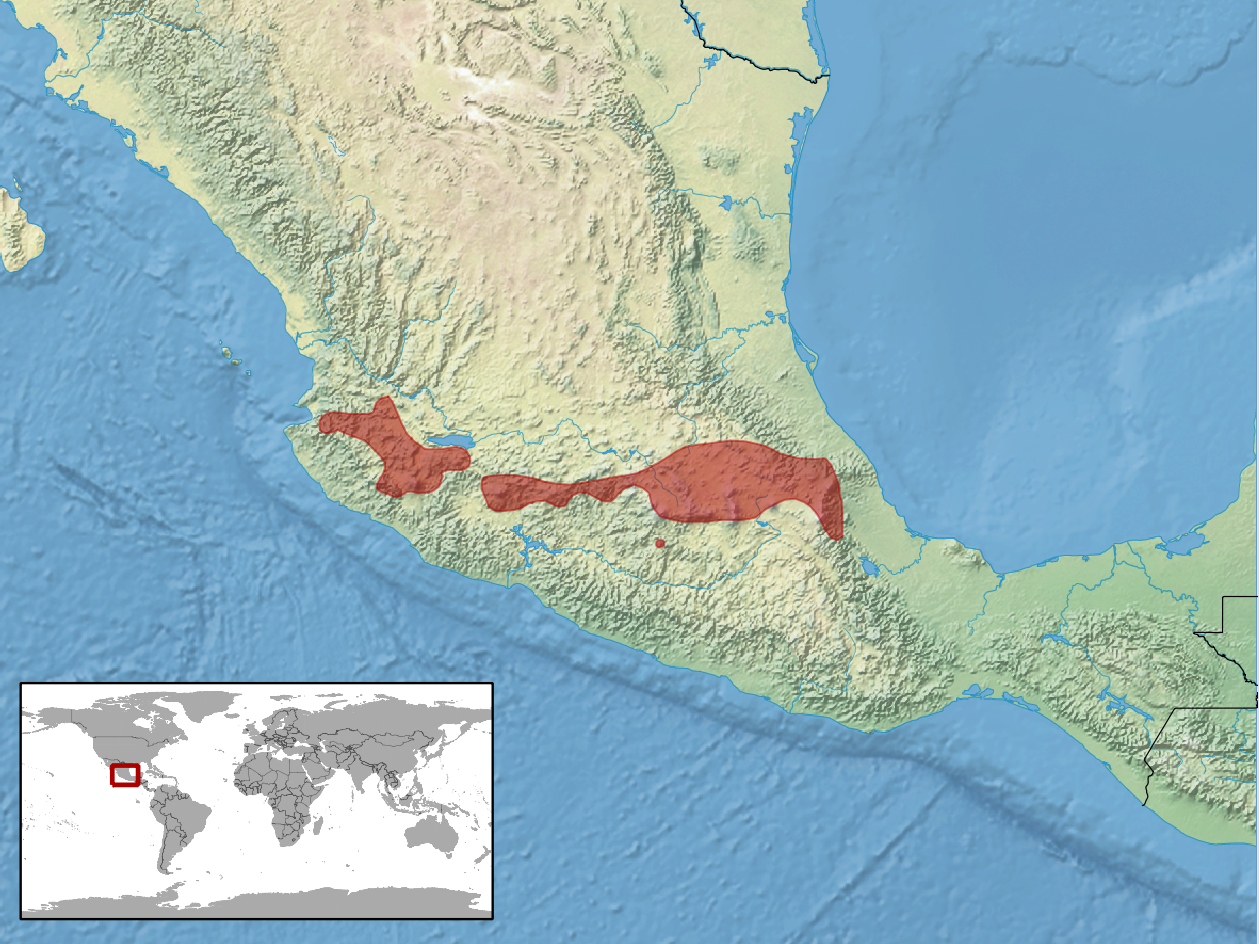

Synonyms
- Uropsophus triseriatus Wagler, 1830; Crot[alus]. triseriatus — Gray, 1831; Crotalus lugubris (part) Jan, 1859; Caudisona lugubris — Cope, 1860; C[audisona]. triseriata — Cope, 1867; Crotalus pallidus Günther, 1895; Crotalus triseriatus — Boulenger, 1896; Crotalus triseriatus triseriatus — Klauber In Githens & George, 1931; Crotalus triseriatus anahuacus — Gloyd, 1940

= Crotalus triseriatus =

Species of snake

Common names: Mexican dusky rattlesnake, dusky rattlesnake

Crotalus triseriatus is a venomous pit viper species found in Mexico. Two subspecies are currently recognized, including the nominate subspecies described here.

== Description ==
Adult male specimens of C. triseriatus commonly grow to a total length (including tail) greater than 60 cm (24 in), with females somewhat smaller. The maximum recorded total length is 68.3 cm (26.9 in).

== Geographic range ==
The species C. triseriatus is found in Mexico, along the southern edge of the Mexican Plateau in the highlands of the Transverse Volcanic Cordillera, including the states of Jalisco, México, Michoacán, Morelos, Nayarit, Puebla, Tlaxcala, and Veracruz. The type locality given by Wagler in 1830 is "Mexico". A restriction to "Alvarez, San Luis Potosí, Mexico" was proposed by H.M. Smith and Taylor (1950).

== Habitat ==
Crotalus triseriatus occurs in pine-oak forest, boreal forest, coniferous forest and, bunchgrass grasslands. On Volcán Orizaba, it is found at very high altitudes. There, the snow line comes down to about 4,572 m (15,000 ft), while green plants can be found up to 4,573 m (15,000 ft): the species has been found within this zone. However, it is most common at 2,700 to 3,350 metres (8,860 to 10,990 ft) in elevation.

== Conservation status ==
The species C. triseriatus is classified as Least Concern on the IUCN Red List of Threatened Species. Species are listed as such due to their wide distribution, presumed large population, or because they are unlikely to be declining fast enough to qualify for listing in a more threatened category. The population trend was stable when assessed in 2007.

== Feeding ==
Prey reportedly found in stomachs of C. triseriatus include a frog, a murid rodent (Neotomodon alstoni), lizards, other small mammals, crickets, and salamanders.

== Venom ==
Bite symptoms from C. triseriatus are reported to include intense pain, swelling, faintness, and cold perspiration.

== Subspecies ==
Subspecies	Taxon author	Common name	Geographic range
C. t. armstrongi	Campbell, 1979	western dusky rattlesnake	Mexico: Jalisco and Nayarit
C. t. triseriatus	(Wagler, 1830)	dusky rattlesnake	Mexico: Michoacán, Morelos, México, Puebla, Tlaxcala and Veracruz

== Etymology ==
The subspecific name, armstrongi, is in honor of American herpetologist Barry L. Armstrong.

== Taxonomy ==
In the relatively recent past, two additional subspecies were described:

- C. t. anahuacus Gloyd, 1940 - currently regarded as a junior synonym of C. t. triseriatus
- C. t. quadrangularis Harris & Simmons, 1978 - currently regarded as a junior synonym of C. aquilus
