= Xitle =

Volcano in Mexico City

Coordinates: 19°14′44″N 99°13′22″W

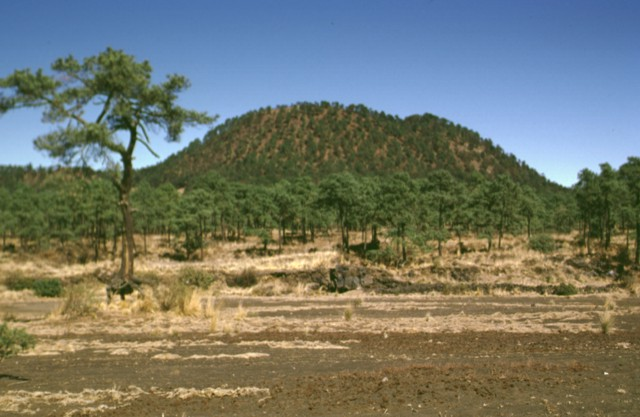

Naming
- Native name: Xictli (Nahuatl languages); Xitle (Spanish)

Geography
- Country: Mexico

Geology
- Volcanic belt: Trans-Mexican Volcanic Belt

Xitle (Spanish pronunciation: [ʃitɬe], from Nahuatl languages: xictli 'navel') is a monogenetic volcano in the Ajusco range in Cumbres del Ajusco National Park. It is located in the Tlalpan borough in the southwestern part of Mexico City. It is an ash cone volcano with a conical form, round base, altitude of approximately 300 metres (980 ft), and a slope between 30° and 40°.

Xitle erupted during the period AD 245-315, according to the results of radiocarbon dating. Among the consequences of this eruption were the formation of the Pedregal de San Ángel lava fields, to the south of the Mexican Federal District. Cuicuilco, one of the most refined cities of Mesoamerica, was destroyed and covered by lava. The subsequent diaspora of the Cuicuilcans, and the attendant diffusion of their culture across most of central Mexico, influenced important cultural changes in the nearby power center of Teotihuacan.

According to some other sources, a series of big volcano eruptions, and the destruction of Cuicuilco took place in the 1st century BC.

== See also ==
- Sierra de Ajusco-Chichinauhtzin
