= Cerro La Cruz del Marqués =

Mountain in Cumbres del Ajusco National Park

Coordinates: 19°12′27.2″N 99°15′29.4″W

Cerro de la Cruz del Marqués is a peak of the Ajusco Mountain Range, and its highest point.

The mountain is located in Cumbres del Ajusco National Park, at the outskirts of Mexico City.
