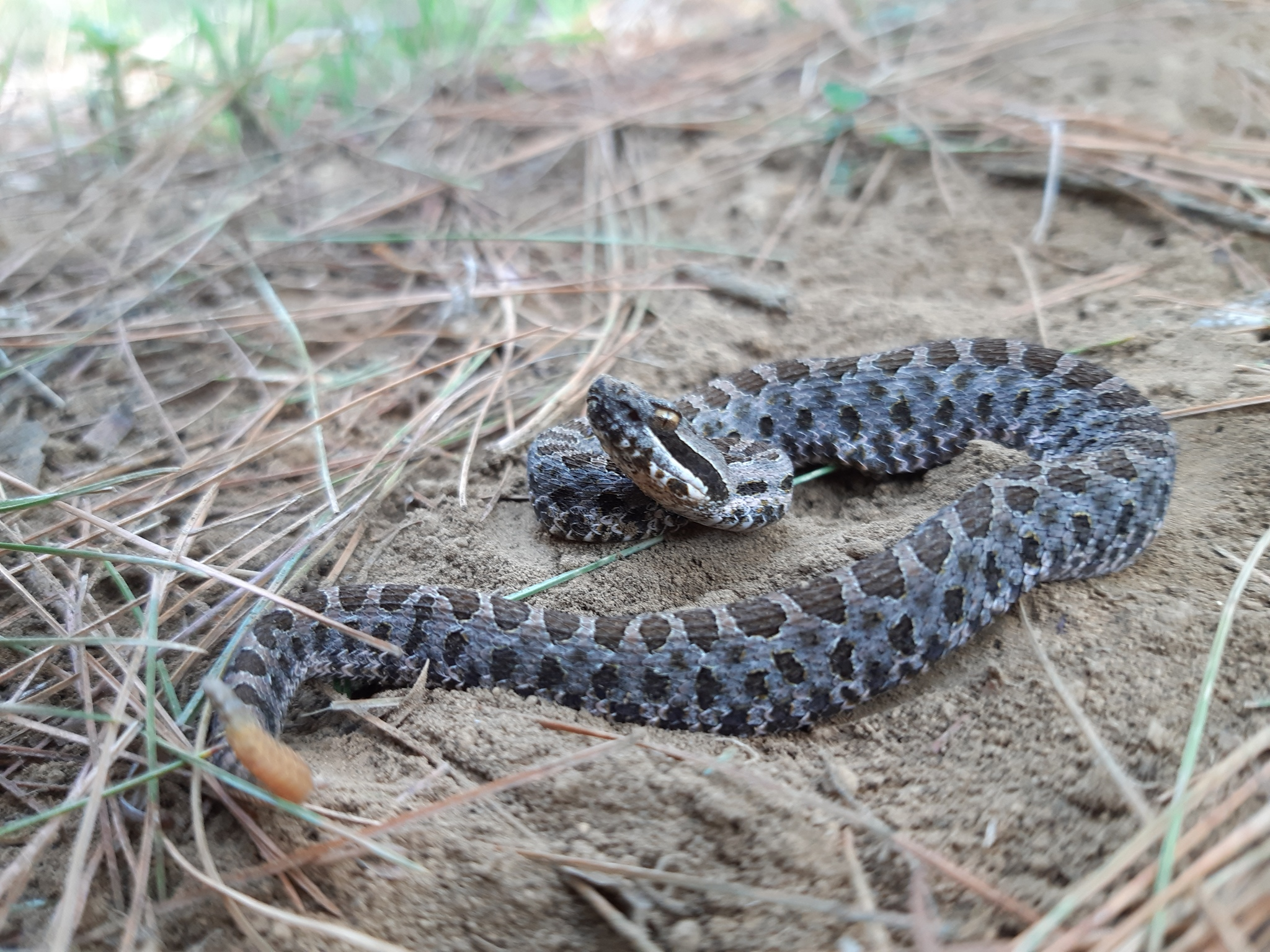
- C. pusillus in Michoacán, Mexico

Conservation status
- Endangered (IUCN 3.1)

Scientific classification
- Kingdom: Animalia
- Phylum: Chordata
- Class: Reptilia
- Order: Squamata
- Suborder: Serpentes
- Family: Viperidae
- Genus: Crotalus
- Species: C. pusillus

Binomial name
- Crotalus pusillus Klauber, 1952
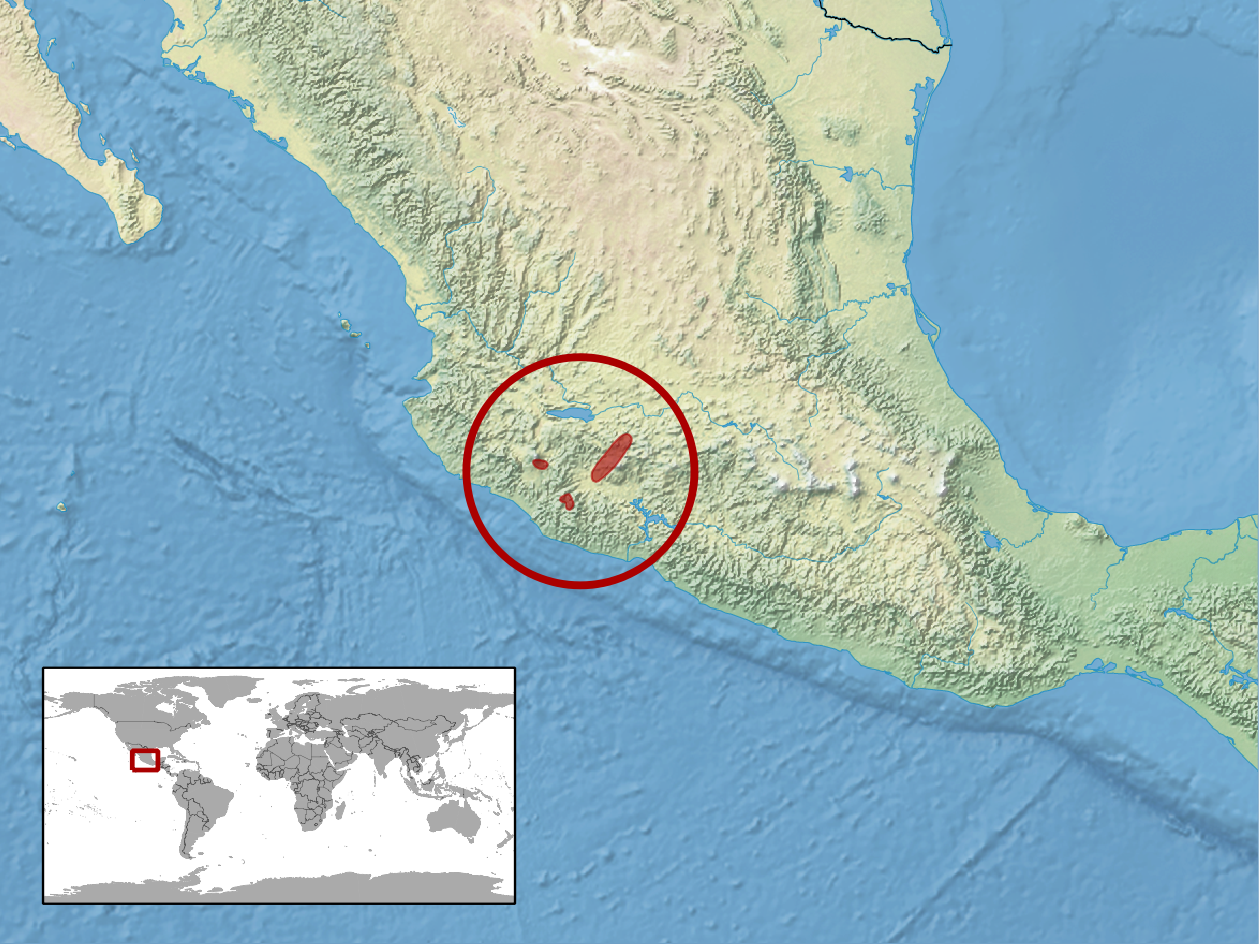

= Crotalus pusillus =

Species of snake

Crotalus pusillus, or the Tancitaran Dusky Rattlesnake, is a venomous pit viper species found in west-central Mexico. No subspecies are currently recognized.

== Description ==
Adult males may grow to more than 50 cm (20 in) in length, while females are smaller. The largest recorded length for a specimen was 68.2 cm (26.9 in).

== Behavior ==
Campbell and Lamar (2004) found this species only to be active during the day. Within its range, night temperatures are low and seem to restrict its activity.

== Geographic range ==
It is found in west-central Mexico in the Sierra de Coalcomán of southwestern Michoacán, the Transverse Volcanic Cordillera of west-central Michoacán, and in adjacent Jalisco. It is probably also found in northeastern Colima. Its type locality is reported as "Tancítaro, Michoacán, Mexico, altitude 5,000 ft" (5,000 ft = 1,524 m). It occurs at elevations between 1,525 and 2,380 metres (5,003 and 7,808 ft).

== Conservation status ==
This species is classified as Endangered on the IUCN Red List of Threatened Species. The population trend was unknown when assessed in 2007.
