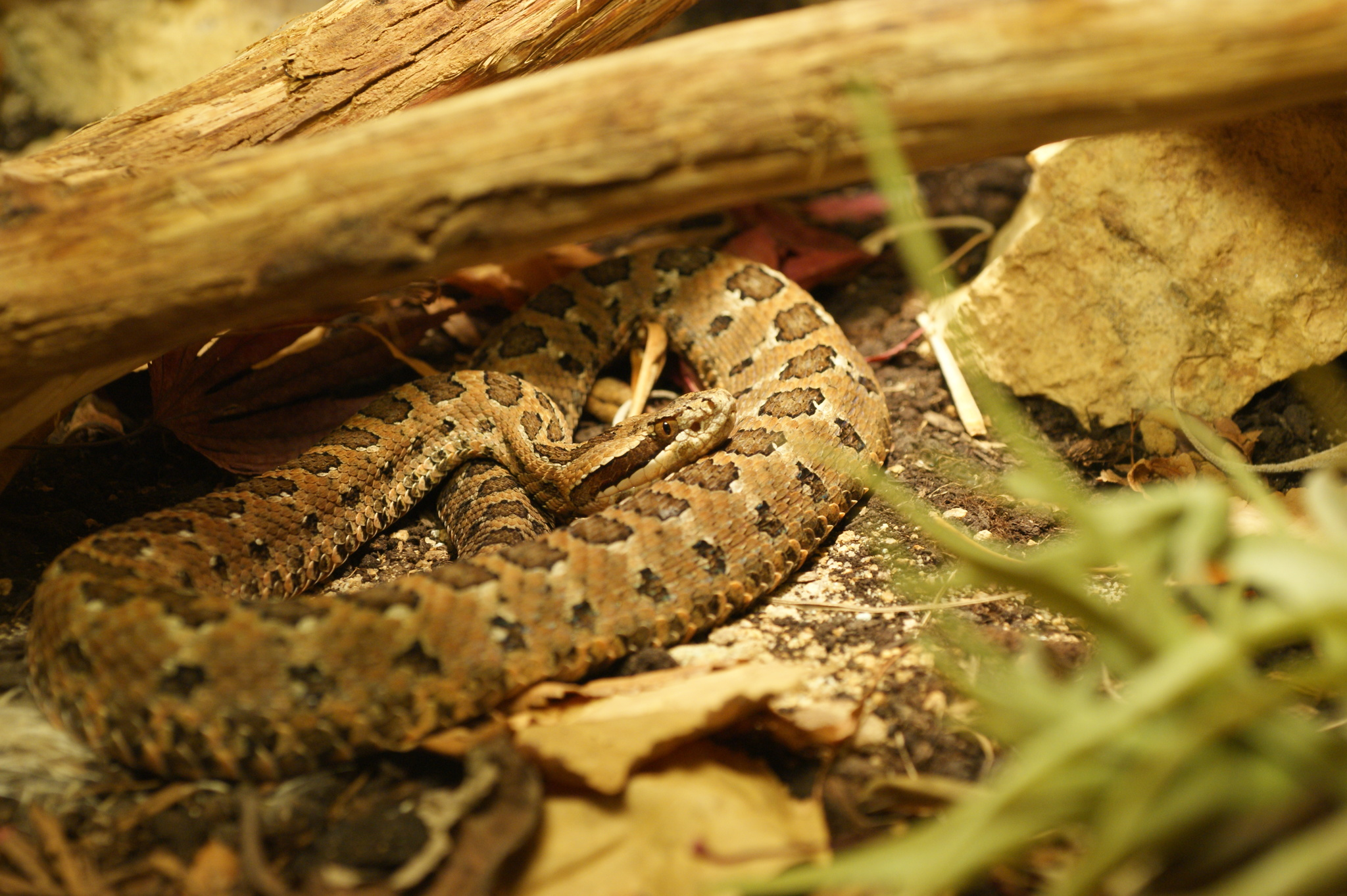
- Crotalus armstrongi in Mexico

Scientific classification
- Kingdom: Animalia
- Phylum: Chordata
- Class: Reptilia
- Order: Squamata
- Suborder: Serpentes
- Family: Viperidae
- Genus: Crotalus
- Species: C. armstrongi

Binomial name
- Crotalus armstrongi Campbell, 1979

Synonyms
- Crotalus triseriatus armstrongi Campbell 1979

= Crotalus armstrongi =

Species of snake

Crotalus armstrongi, the western dusky rattlesnake, is a species of pit viper in the family Viperidae. The species is endemic to Mexico. It is a relatively small venomous snake and is known for its distinctive dusky coloration. No subspecies are recognized.
