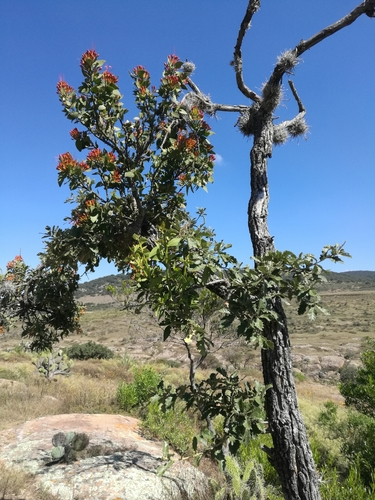

Conservation status
- Least Concern (IUCN 3.1)

Scientific classification
- Kingdom: Plantae
- Clade: Embryophytes
- Clade: Tracheophytes
- Clade: Spermatophytes
- Clade: Angiosperms
- Clade: Eudicots
- Clade: Rosids
- Order: Fagales
- Family: Fagaceae
- Genus: Quercus
- Subgenus: Quercus subg. Quercus
- Section: Quercus sect. Quercus
- Species: Q. deserticola

Binomial name
- Quercus deserticola Trel.

Synonyms
- Quercus alveolata Trel.; Quercus bipedalis Trel.; Quercus tamiapensis C.H.Mull.; Quercus texcocana Trel.

= Quercus deserticola =

Species of oak tree

Quercus deserticola is a Mexican species of oaks in the beech family. It grows in central Mexico in the States of Guanajuato, Mexico, Hidalgo, Jalisco, Querétaro, Oaxaca, Sinaloa, Puebla, and Michoacán.

== Description ==
Quercus deserticola is a shrub or small tree sometimes as much as 7 metres (23 feet) in height, with gray bark. The twigs are yellow-green and densely hairy. The leaves are oblong, hairy, semi-leathery, up to 85 millimetres (3 1/4 inches) long, sometimes toothless but other times with 2–5 teeth on either side, the teeth sometimes arranged asymmetrically.
