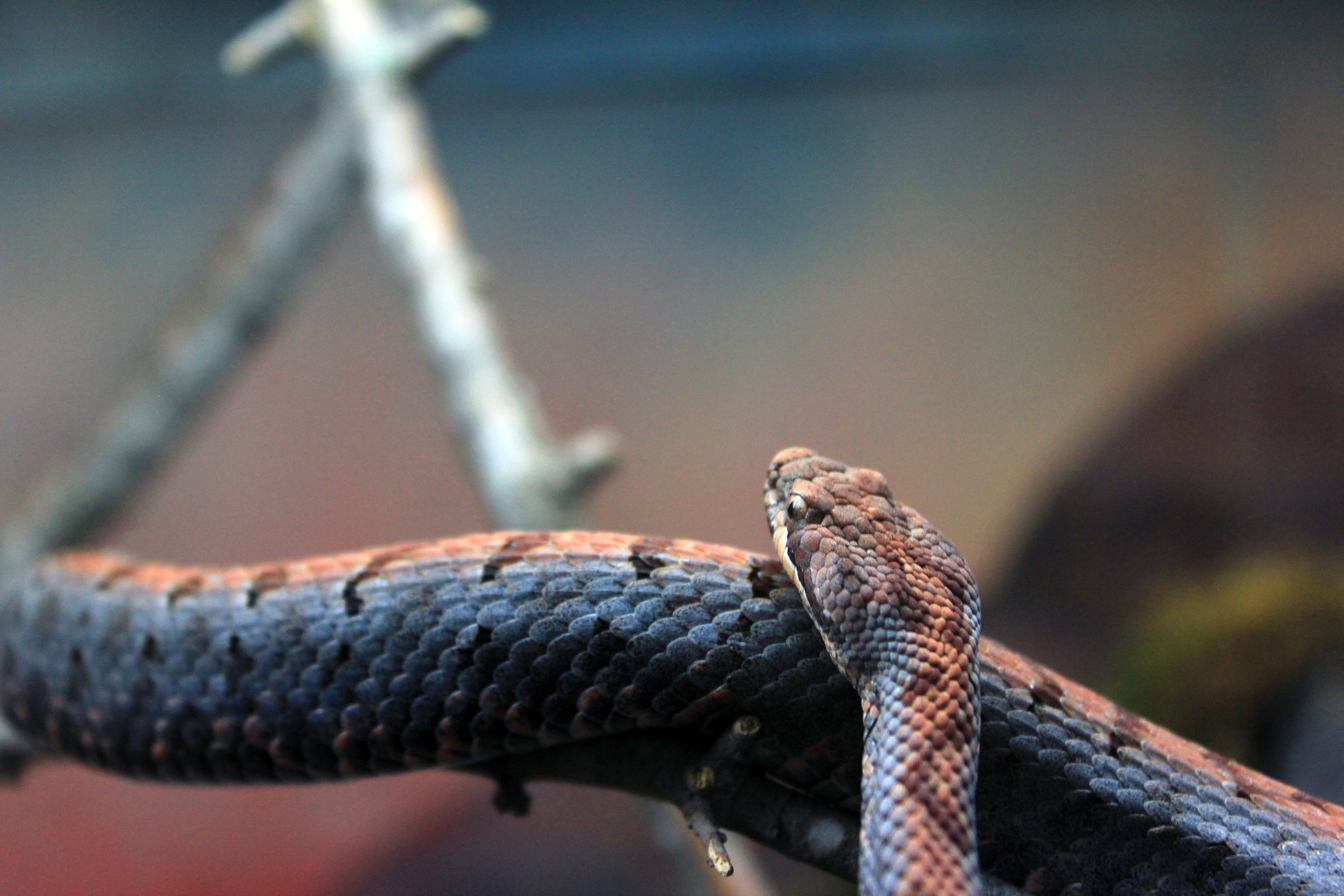

Conservation status
- Least Concern (IUCN 3.1)

Scientific classification
- Kingdom: Animalia
- Phylum: Chordata
- Class: Reptilia
- Order: Squamata
- Suborder: Serpentes
- Family: Viperidae
- Genus: Crotalus
- Species: C. transversus

Binomial name
- Crotalus transversus Taylor, 1944
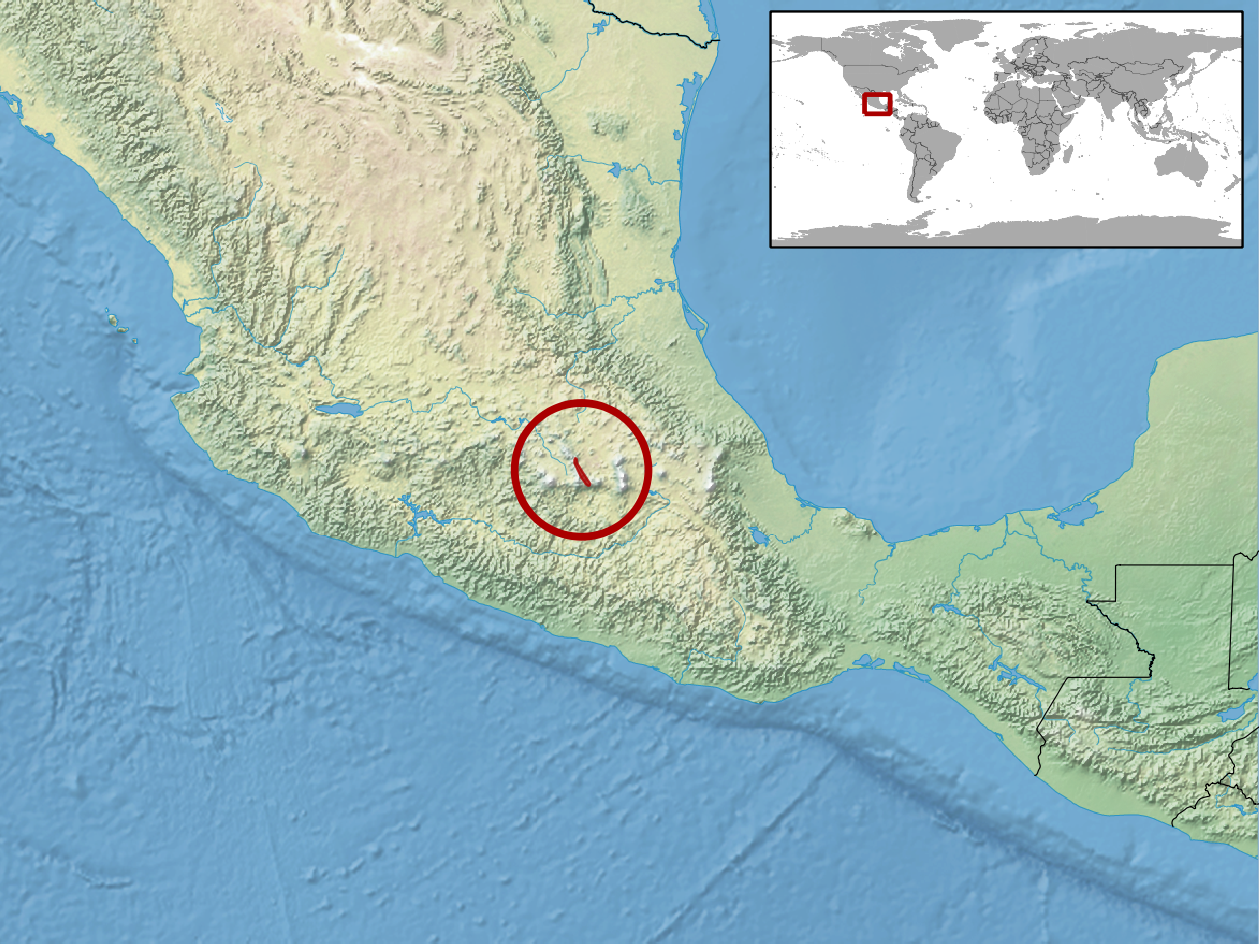

= Crotalus transversus =

Species of snake

Crotalus transversus, or the cross-banded mountain rattlesnake, is a species of venomous pit viper found in central Mexico, known from less than 20 specimens. No subspecies are currently recognized.

== Description ==
Adult females grow to a maximum recorded length of 46.5 cm (18.3 in). The length of the tail represents 10.5% of total body length in males and 7.1-7.9% in females.

== Geographic range ==
It is found in central Mexico in the Sierra Ajusco and the Sierra de Monte Alto of the Transverse Volcanic Cordillera in the states of México and Morelos at elevations exceeding 2,900 m (9,500 ft) in temperate boreal forests. The type locality given is "about 55 km. SW México (city), near Tres Marías (Tres Cumbres), Morelos [Mexico], elevation about 10,000 ft." (3,000 m)

== Conservation status ==
This species is classified as Least Concern on the IUCN Red List of Threatened Species. The population trend was stable when assessed in 2007.
