= Tepoztlán =

- City
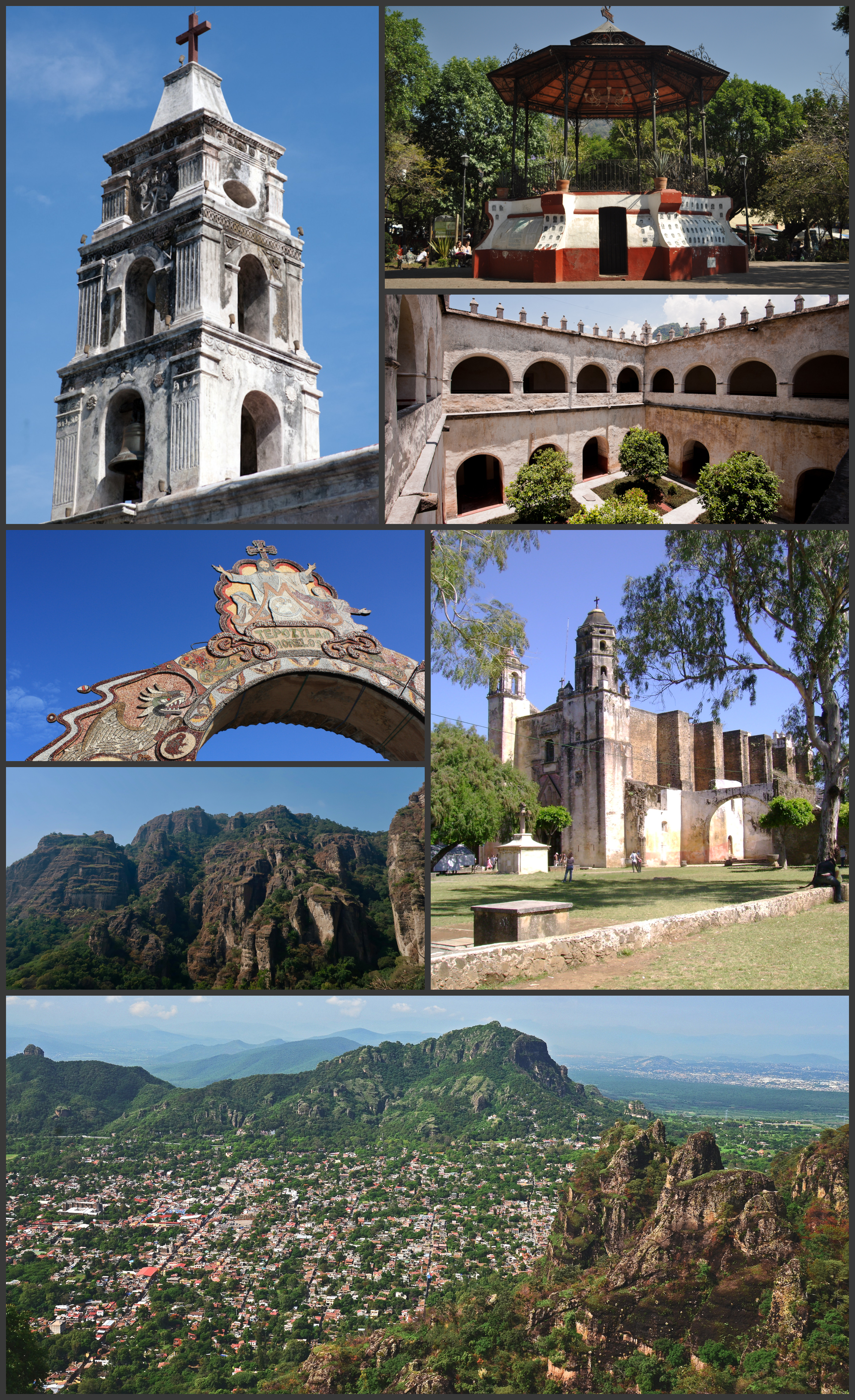
- From top to bottom from left to right: Church of San Miguel de Arcangel, Municipal Kiosk, Former Convent of Tepoztlán, Arch in the church of Tepoztlán, Hills around Tepoztlán, Temple and Old Convent of the Nativity, Panoramic view of Tepoztlán.

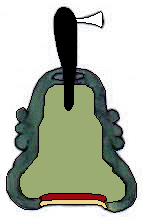
- Coat of arms
- Nickname: Tepoz
- Location within Mexico Location within Morelos
- Coordinates: 18°59′7″N 99°5′59″W
- Country: Mexico
- State: Morelos

Government
  - Municipal President: Perseo Quiroz Rendón (2024-2027)
- Elevation: 1,700 m (5,600 ft)

Population (2020)
  - Total: 54,987
- Demonyms: Tepozteco (a)
- Time zone: UTC−06:00 (CST)
  - Summer (DST): UTC−05:00 (CDT)

Tepoztlán (Spanish: [tepos'tlan]) is a town in the central Mexican state of Morelos. It is located at 18°59′07″N 99°05′59″W in the heart of the Tepoztlán Valley. The town serves as the seat of government for the municipality of the same name. The town had a population of 14,130 inhabitants, while the municipality reported 41,629 inhabitants in the 2010 national census.

The town is a popular tourist destination near Mexico City. The town is famous for the remains of El Tepozteco temple built on top of the nearby Tepozteco Mountain, as well as for the exotic ice cream flavors prepared by the townspeople.

Tepoztlán was named a "Pueblo Mágico" (or magic town) in 2002 but its title was removed in 2009 for failure to maintain the requirements. In 2010, Tepoztlán addressed these problems and recovered the Pueblo Mágico title.

== Etymology ==
Tepoztlán is derived from Nahuatl and means "place of abundant copper" or "place of the broken rocks." This is derived from the words tepoz-tli (copper) and tlan ("place of/place of abundance").

== Geography ==
=== Climate ===
The climate around the Tepoztlán Sierra (where el Tepozteco is located) shows temperate as well as some subtropical variations. The rainy season starts during the summer and ends at the beginning of autumn. Precipitation reaches 1,000 mm (39.4 in)/yr in the Tepoztlán Valley and up to 1,200 mm (47.2 in)/yr in the mountains.

== Economy ==
Agriculture especially the growing of maize, chili and tomatoes, livestock growing. Traditional pottery and handicrafts (for which there is a lively weekend market or tianguis).

Tourism: Nowadays Tepoztlán gets its most important income through tourism. People visit the town for its authentic traditional environment, along with the pyramid and several communities with ecological or progressive thinking.

Real estate: The legal system that regulates possession of land in Tepoztlán is communal. Under that legal framework, land in Tepoztlán cannot be purchased. In case of problems, neither financial nor judicial institutions can support ownership claims.

Meztitla Scout Camp School is owned by the Mexican government, located near Tepozteco mountain. Meztitla is the National Scout Camp School. Although Meztitla is frequented by Scouts of Mexico and from around the world, it is also open to the general public.

== History ==
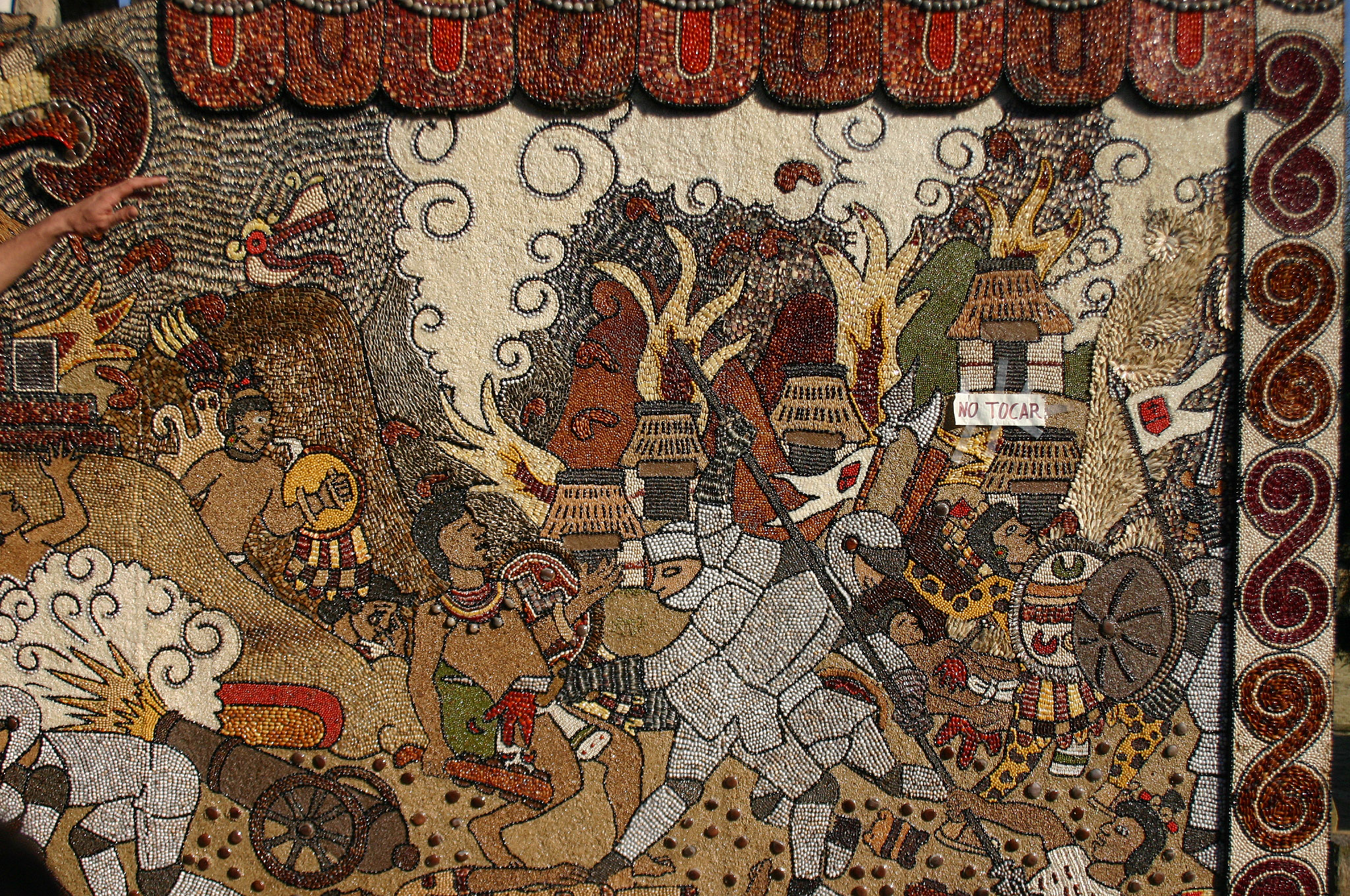
Mural made from seeds at the church gate

According to myth, Amatlán, in the municipality of Tepoztlan is the birthplace of Ce Acatl, later known as Topiltzin Ce Acatl Quetzalcoatl, and who may be the possible historical basis of the Mesoamerican god Quetzalcoatl over 1200 years ago, the feathered serpent god widely worshipped in ancient Mexico.

It has not yet been possible to determine who first inhabited the area. The earliest findings of pottery and other ceramic utensils date back to approximately 1500 BCE.

At the top of a hill, there is a small pyramid devoted to Ometochtli-Tepoztēcatl, the supposed inventor of pulque, a beer-like drink made from the maguey plant. The pyramid, called El Tepozteco, dates from the Post-Classic Period (900–1521 CE) and has inscriptions dating from 1452 and 1502.

The town was incorporated into the Aztec Empire under the rule of Moctezuma I. Local rulers had the titles chichimecahueytzintecuhtli and cacamteutli, but political power may have been less centralized here than elsewhere in Morelos. Local products included cotton, maguey, amate and limestone. Tepoztlan fought wars against Cuauhnahuac and Yecapixtla.

During the Spanish Conquest (1521), Hernán Cortés is said to have ordered the town razed after the refusal of the town leaders to meet him. This event was chronicled by Bernal Díaz del Castillo in The Conquest of New Spain. A monastery was built here by the Dominicans between 1555 and 1580, and in 1993 was declared World Heritage by the UNESCO. Colonial-era judges had the titles tlalcuhcalcaltzintle, tecpanecatzintli and zuacoatzintli.

Anthropologists Robert and Margaret Park Redfield lived in Tepoztlán 1926-27 and published Tepoztlan, a Mexican Village: A Study in Folk Life, and "Notes on the Cookery of Tepoztlan, Morelos"

Surrealist painter Wolfgang Paalen lived and worked in Tepoztlán during his last Mexican period (1954–59).

The hiking trail the Sierra de Tepoztlan to the pyramid was closed temporally after the 2017 Puebla earthquake. 203 homes were destroyed and 744 were damaged in the municipality.

In response to the COVID-19 pandemic in Mexico, Tepoztlan blocked the entrances to the community. As of April 27, 2020, two cases were reported in Tepoztlán. Schools and many businesses were closed from mid March until June 1. On July 2, Tepoztlán reported five infections but no deaths from the virus; the reopening of the state was pushed back until at least June 13. Tepoztlán reported 75 cases, 58 recuperations, and nine deaths from the virus as of August 31. One hundred thirty-three cases were reported on December 27, 2020. The community health center was briefly closed when employees protested against the lack of vaccines; it reopened January 21 after being promised vaccines.

A fire that burned 60 hectares (150 acres) of forest from May 19 to 22, 2020, was allegedly provoked by a 25-year-old woman as a stunt to get on TikTok. The fire threatened not only the forest but also the town of Santo Domingo Ocotitlan. She could be sentenced to ten years of prison. The Procuraduría Federal de Protección al Ambiente (Federal Attorney for Environmental Protection, PROFEPA) says it will seek financial and penal compensation.

== The Legend of Tepozteco ==
There are several versions of the story of Tepozteco. One that describes a man by the last name of Tepoztón who is born to a laundress and ends up working in Tenochtitlan, Mexico where he is converted to Catholicism. As a form of payment for some work he did helping to hang a bell at one of the Catholic churches, he receives 3 boxes and is instructed not to open them. However, his curiosity wins and he opens the boxes. Opening the boxes let out the birds that were inside which acted as a symbol of the riches and wellbeing of the people.

Another version of the story refers to Tepozteco as a person who was baptized and introduced to the Catholic Church on September 8, 1532 in the Axitla River, at the base of the mountain where a statue of Ometochtli was found. A young 22-year-old missionary named Fray Domingo de la anunciación, baptized Tepozteco after having thrown the idol, worshiped by pilgrims from Chiapas and Guatemala, off a cliff.

Four important gentlemen from surrounding areas: Yautepec, Oaxtepec, Tlayacapan, and Cuauhnahuac, accuse Tepozteco of having betrayed their gods and they challenge him. He defeats them and with the strength of his speech, convinces them of all the goodness of the new religion.

Of this legend, let's point out that one of the four natural elements is spoken of; the air, which is attributed with thinking or reasoning. We see that this characteristic is brought up when Tepoztecatl, comes out on top of every difficult situation that he faces. Reasonably, he boasts that he is son of Quetzalcoatl, "God of the Wind," which allows him to be protected by him at every moment.

== The municipality ==
The municipality is one of 17 municipalities that border Mexico City. It borders the Milpa Alta borough at the south side of the capital city. Rogelio Torres Ortega of Juntos Haremos Historia (Together we will make history coalition) was elected Presidente Municipal (mayor) in the election of July 1, 2018.

=== Towns and villages ===
The largest localities (cities, towns, and villages) are:

Name	2010 Census Population
Tepoztlán	14,130
Santa Catarina	4,521
Unidad Habitacional Rinconada Acolapa	3,205
Loma Bonita	2,332
San Juan Tlacotenco	1,890
Santo Domingo Ocotitlán	1,541
Tetecolala	1,449
San Andrés de la Cal	1,383
Colonia Obrera	1,316
Colonia Ángel Bocanegra (Adolfo López Mateos)	1,235
Amatlán de Quetzalcóatl	1,029
Santiago Tepetlapa	847
Total Municipality	41,629

== Attractions and festivals ==
- Carnaval in Tepoztlan is the largest in Morelos. It takes place for three days before Ash Wednesday.
- September 8. Fiestas to honor Tepozteco and Virgin of the Nativity in Tepoztlan.
- San Juan Tlacotenco is located at an altitude of 2,350 meters above sea level, 5 kilometers north of Tepoztlan, with exuberant forests within the Chichinahutzin Biological Corridor and the Tepozteco National Park (est. 1937). The foundation of the town dates from around 1100 AD, by the arrival of the Nahuatl-speaking immigrants. San Juan was the stop on the Mexico City-Cuernavaca rail line, from 1897 to 1997, that is closest to Tepoztlan. In 1993 archaeological pieces dating from 1028 CE were found in a nearby hill called Chimalacatepetl; these are located in a small museum that opened in 1995. The feast of St. John is celebrated on June 24. Spelunkers will enjoy exploring the Cueva del Diablo (Devil's Cave), Cueva del Ferrocarril (Railroad Cave), and other caves in the area.
- Santa Catalina is west of Tepoztlan. The church, dedicated to St. Catherine of Alexandria, has a delicately-decorated bell tower of two levels. St. Catherine's feast day is November 24.
- Amatlán is east of Tepoztlán. The mythical birthplace of the god Quetzálcoatl is located by an exuberant waterfall a short hike out of town. Amatlán has two festivals during the year: May 29 in honor of Quetzalcoatl, and June 22 for the Feast of Santa Magdalena.
- Museo Carlos Pellicer located behind the monastery, is an archaeological museum that opened in 1965.
- Meztitla Scout Camp School is a campground/school owned and operated since 1956 by the Asociación de Scouts de México, Asociación Civil. The name means "Place near the Moon"; besides hosting activities for Scouts from around the world, it is open to the general public for hiking, camping, and rappel. It is located in Santo Domingo Ocuitco, west of Tepoztlan.

=== Pyramid of Tepozteco ===
The archaeological site of El Tepozteco is centered on the 13th-century temple dedicated to Tepoztēcatl, god of pulque. The sanctuary is located at 2,310 meters above sea level (7,579 feet) while the main plaza of Tepoztlán is at 1,715 m (5,627 ft). A rustic trail leads up to the sanctuary, climbing 595 m (1,952 ft) along 2 km (1 1/4 miles) of length. Due to the steep climb and rough terrain, people take anywhere from 20 minutes to three hours to make the journey.

From the summit there are views of the town of Tepoztlan and the Valley of Cuernavaca. As the national park is located within the Chichinautzin Biological Corridor there is plenty of rich flora and fauna.

=== Museo Ex Convento de Tepoztlán (Museo de la Natividad) ===
The Tepoztlán Ex Convento Museum was built by the Tepoztecan Indians under the orders of the Dominican friars between 1555 and 1580, dedicated to the Virgin of the Nativity. In 1993, INAH created a restoration project and in 1994 it was declared a World Heritage Site by UNESCO. This site is the parish of the Nativity and the Museum and Historical Documentation Center of Tepoztlán.

This monastery consists of a large atrium that has served as a cemetery and park. There are four capillas posas in each of the corners, although only the ones on the north side are well-preserved. The capillas posas were invented in Nueva España for the instruction of large crowds of Indigenous, and their use later spread to Guatemala, Colombia, Peru, and Bolivia.

== See also ==
- Quetzalcoatl
- Topiltzin Ce Acatl Quetzalcoatl
- Morelos
- Meztitla Scout Camp School
- List of people from Morelos

== Other sources ==
- Encyclopedia of Mexican Municipalities: Tepoztlán - In Spanish.
