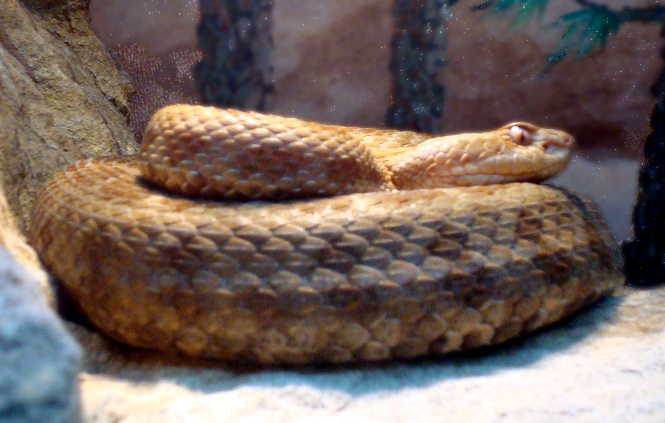

Conservation status
- Least Concern (IUCN 3.1)

Scientific classification
- Kingdom: Animalia
- Phylum: Chordata
- Class: Reptilia
- Order: Squamata
- Suborder: Serpentes
- Family: Viperidae
- Genus: Crotalus
- Species: C. aquilus

Binomial name
- Crotalus aquilus Klauber, 1952
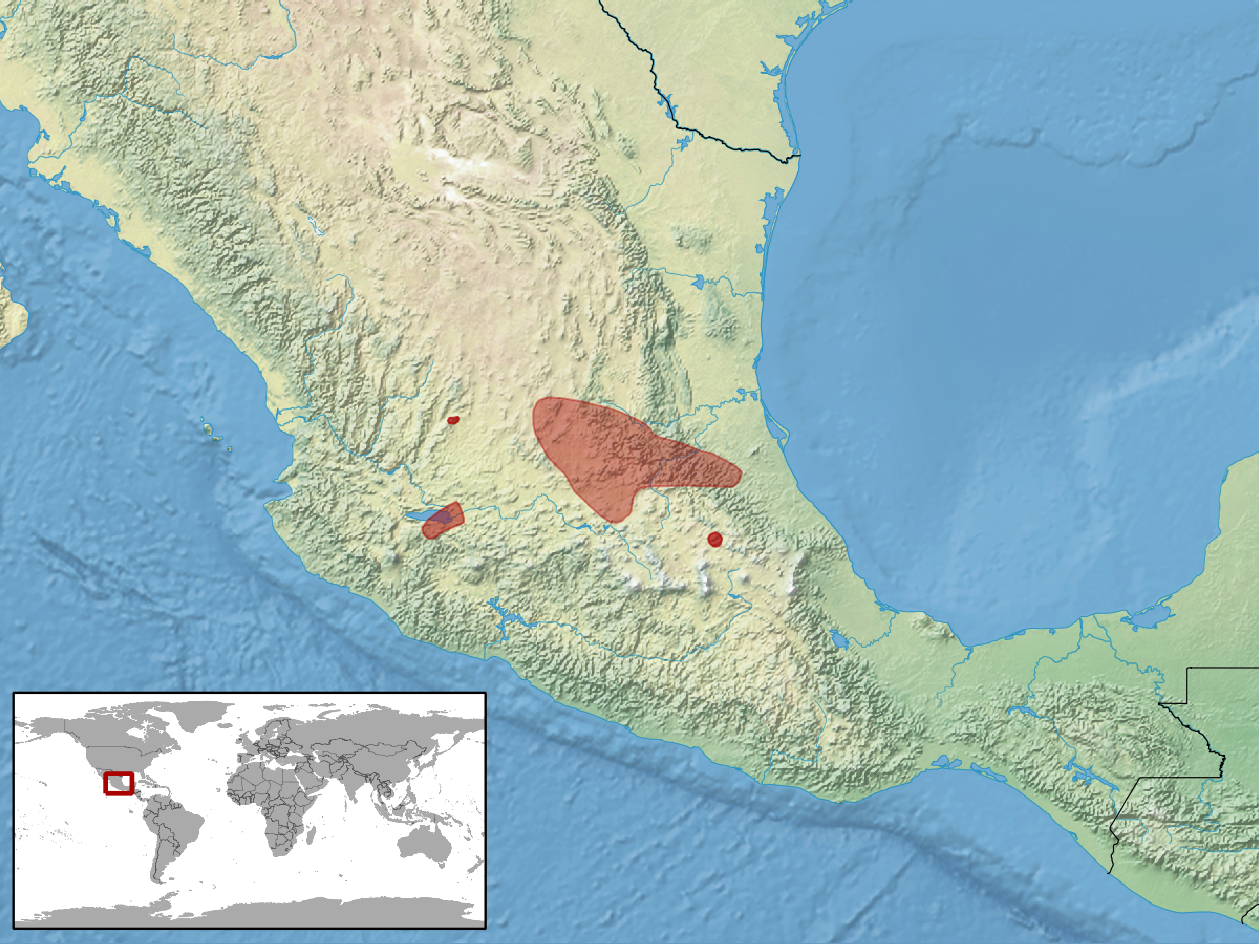

Synonyms
- Crotalus triseriatus aquilus Klauber, 1952; Crotalus triseriatus quadrangularis Harris & Simmons, 1978; C[rotalus]. aquilus – Dorcas, 1992; Crotalus aquilus – Liner, 1994; Crotalus aquilus – McDiarmid et al., 1999

= Crotalus aquilus =

Species of snake

Crotalus aquilus, known as the Querétaro dusky rattlesnake or Queretaran dusky rattlesnake, is a pit viper species found in the highlands of central Mexico. Like all other pit vipers, it is venomous. No subspecies are currently recognized. The specific name, aquilus, is Latin for "eagle" and refers to the high altitude at which this species is found.

== Description ==
This species grows to a maximum reported total length of 67.8 cm (26.7 in), but most adult specimens, which have been described as heavy-bodied, are less than 50 cm (20 in) long.

== Geographic range ==
They are found in the highlands of central Mexico in Guanajuato, Hidalgo, México, Michoacán, and San Luis Potosí. The type locality given is "near Alvarez, San Luis Potosí, Mexico".

== Habitat ==
These snakes are found in the open grassy and generally rocky habitats north of the Trans-Mexican Volcanic Belt. They also occur in pine-oak forest, open karstic areas, grassy mountain meadows, and stony mesquite-grassland.

== Conservation status ==
This species is classified as Least Concern on the IUCN Red List (v3.1, 2001). Species are listed as such due to their wide distribution, presumed large population, or because they are unlikely to be declining fast enough to qualify for listing in a more threatened category. The population trend was down when assessed in 2007.
