= El Tepozteco =

Archaeological site in the Mexican state of Morelos

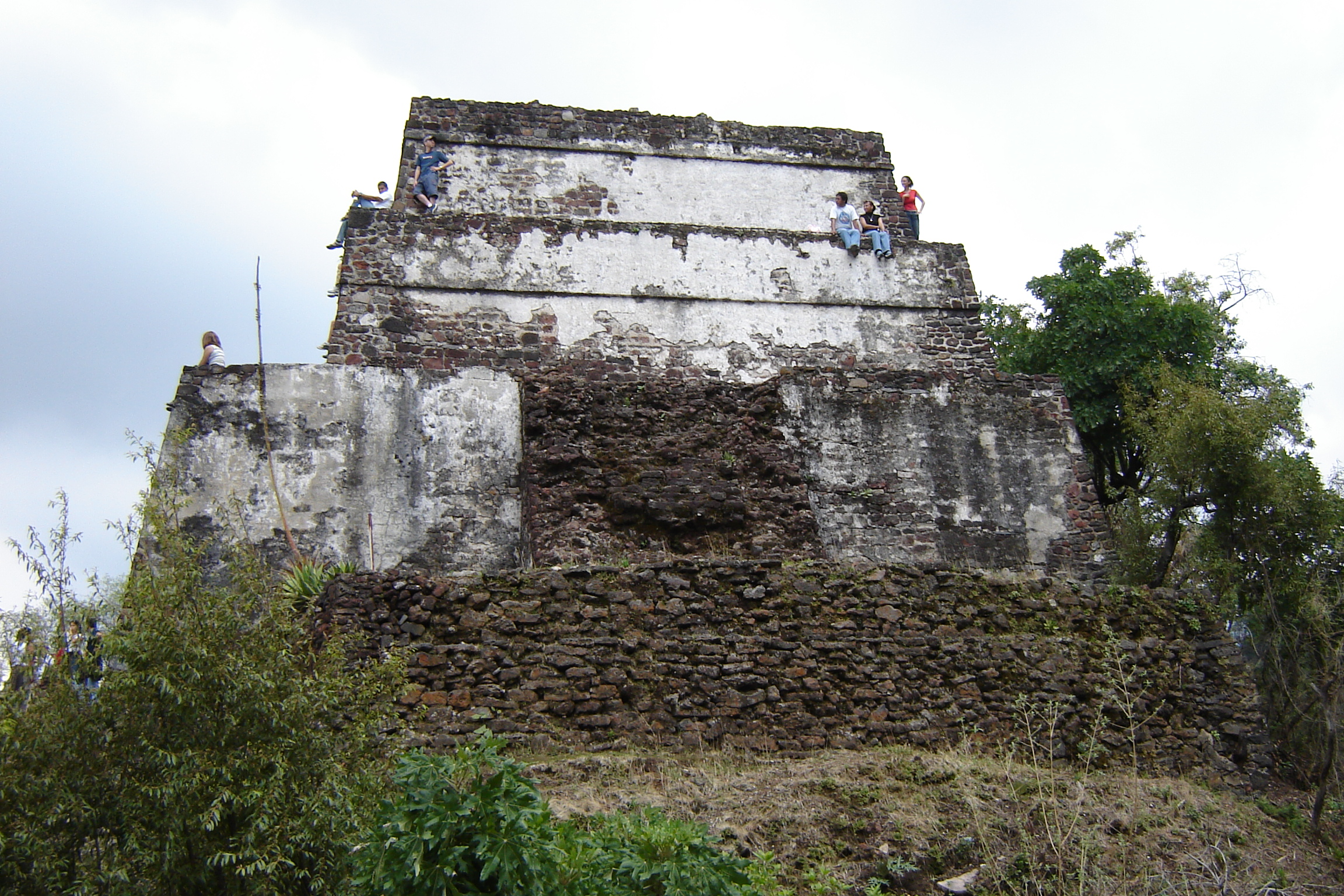
- The Aztec pyramid of El Tepozteco

Religion
- Affiliation: Aztec
- Deity: Tepoztēcatl
- Status: ruined

Location
- Location: Mexico
- Municipality: Tepoztlan
- State: Morelos
- Interactive map of El Tepozteco
- Coordinates: 19°0′3.28″N 99°6′4.19″W

Architecture
- Type: Temple
- Style: Aztec

Specifications
- Direction of façade: WNW
- Height (max): 12.4 meters
- Elevation: 2,310 m (7,579 ft)

Website
- El Tepozteco at INAH (in Spanish)

El Tepozteco is an archaeological site in the Mexican state of Morelos. It consists of a small temple to Tepoztēcatl, the Aztec god of the alcoholic beverage pulque.

In the middle Postclassic Period, various terraces and a small pyramid were built on one of the peaks of the Sierra de Tepoztlan, overlooking the pre-Columbian town of Tepoztlan. The temple became important enough to attract pilgrims from as far away as Guatemala, although the cult of Tepoztecatl was local to this site. The Sierra de Tepoztlan and the temple site are within El Tepozteco National Park.

== Description ==
The temple itself stands at the western side of the site. It consists of a 6.4-meter-high platform supporting a 3.3-meter-high temple base. Upon this stand the remains of the temple building, the remains of which now stand 2.7 meters high. The temple was formed of two rooms. The first room opened onto the temple stairs, with two pillars flanking the entrance. In the centre of this room a small hollow was found, containing traces of charcoal and copal.

The entry to the small inner sanctum was also flanked by two pillars. The sculpture of Tepoztecatl was probably kept in this room.

The temple was modified several times during its history. The first consisted of a narrowing of the entrance to the inner sanctum by building flanking walls against the formerly free-standing inner pillars. The second, and most important, modification was the addition of stone benches and a small projecting cornice. On the cornice are bas-reliefs of the glyphs of the 20 days of the sacred tonalpohualli calendar.

Dwellings were built on the terraces on the eastern side of the site in order to house the resident priests and their helpers.

== Interpretations ==
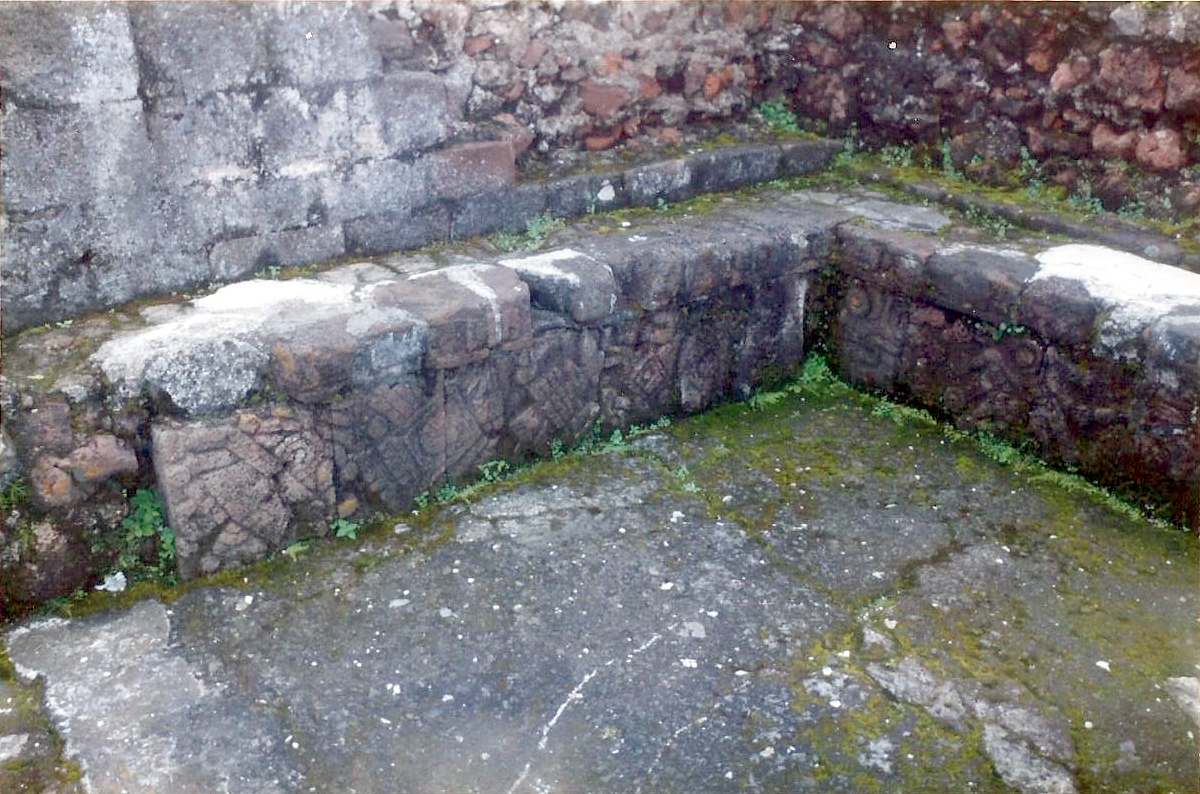
Sculpted glyphs on the stone bench inside the temple shrine

In the ruins of the temple were found two fallen stones with glyphs, one stone bears the name of the eighth Aztec emperor Ahuizotl, the other with the calendrical date "10 rabbit". This date represents the year 1502 A.D., the year that this emperor died. From this, some archeologists have concluded that this was the year in which the temple was built, others suggest that these stones were added later to commemorate the death of the Aztec emperor. Some glyphs include a turquoise crown and a shield with arrows, which have led investigators to conclude that the benches were built by the Triple Alliance some time after 1452 A.D., the year when the Alliance conquered Tepoztlan.

== See also ==
- List of Mesoamerican pyramids
