= Ajusco =

Volcano in Mexico City, Mexico

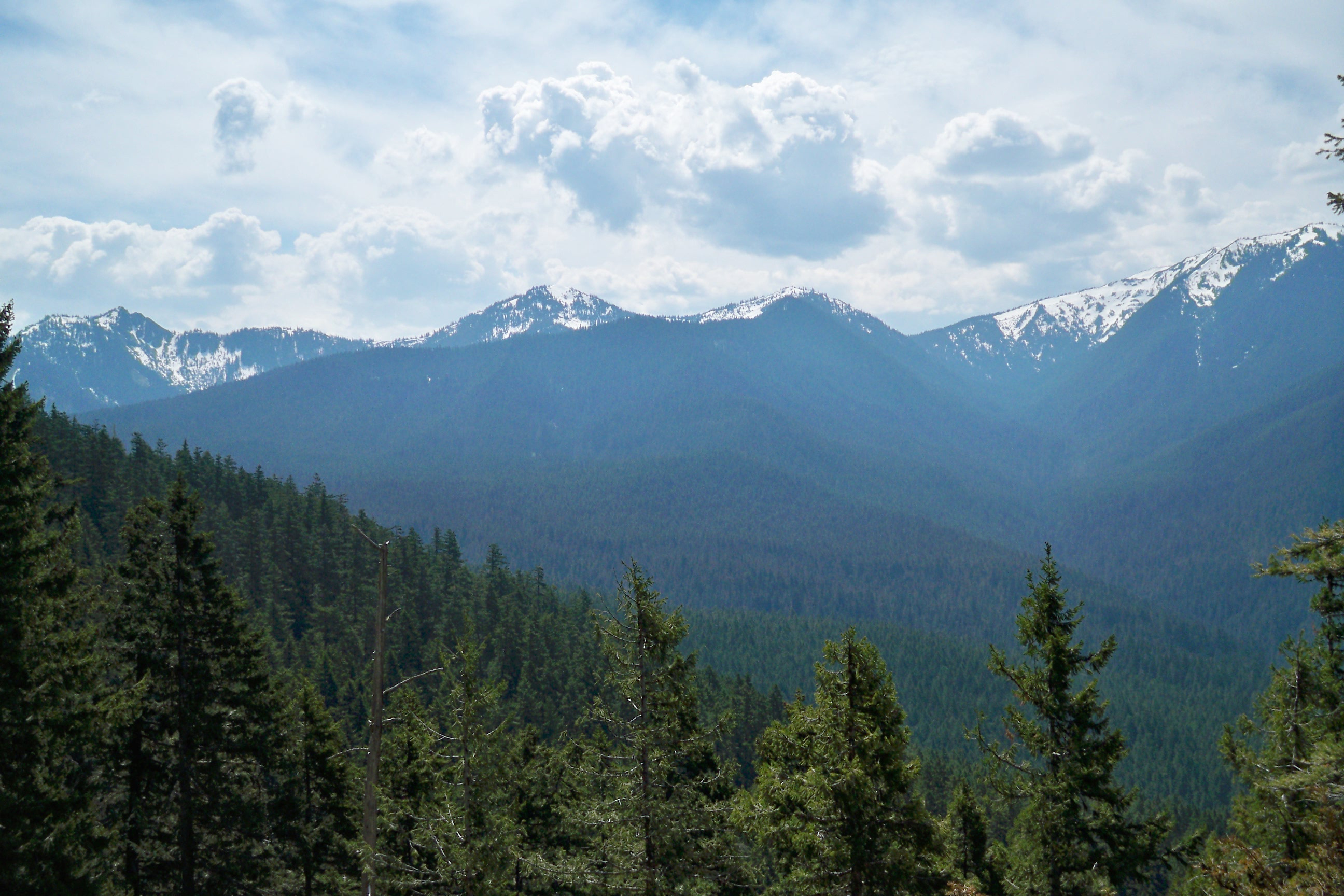
- Ajusco, view from UNAM

Highest point
- Elevation: 3,930 m (12,890 ft)
- Coordinates: 19°12′27″N 99°15′29″W

Geography
- Location within Mexico Location within State of Mexico
- Parent range: Sierra de Ajusco-Chichinauhtzin

Geology
- Rock age: Pliocene-Pleistocene
- Mountain type: Lava dome volcano
- Volcanic belt: Trans-Mexican Volcanic Belt

Climbing
- Easiest route: Trail

Ajusco is a 3,930 m (12,894 ft) lava dome volcano located just south of Mexico City, Mexico, in the Tlalpan borough of the city. It is the highest point in the city.

== Etymology ==
Ajusco is a Náhuatl word variously translated as "source of waters" or "watered grove", and the Lerma River and Balsas River draw some of their source waters from this area. Also, the flow from all of the remaining strong springs in the area adjacent to the peak are captured to augment Mexico City's water supply.

== Geology ==
Ajusco is a lava dome complex of Pliocene-Pleistocene age, surrounded by block and ash flow deposits. Ajusco is part of the mountain chain of volcanic origin known as Sierra de Ajusco-Chichinauhtzin, among which Xitle (3,128 m or 10,262 ft), Tláloc (3,690 m or 12,106 ft), Pelado (3,620 m or 11,877 ft), Cuautzin (3,510 m or 11,516 ft) and Chichinautzin (3,470 m or 11,385 ft) stand out. This range is part of the Trans-Mexican Volcanic Belt which crosses central Mexico and contains the country's highest peaks.

== Ecology ==
Parts of this range account for about half of the area of the Mexican Federal District, the rest of which is occupied by Mexico City. The area is important for conservation of local ecosystems. In its oak, pine and fir forests there are unique endemic species like the teporingo rabbit and the volcano mouse.

== Sites of interest ==
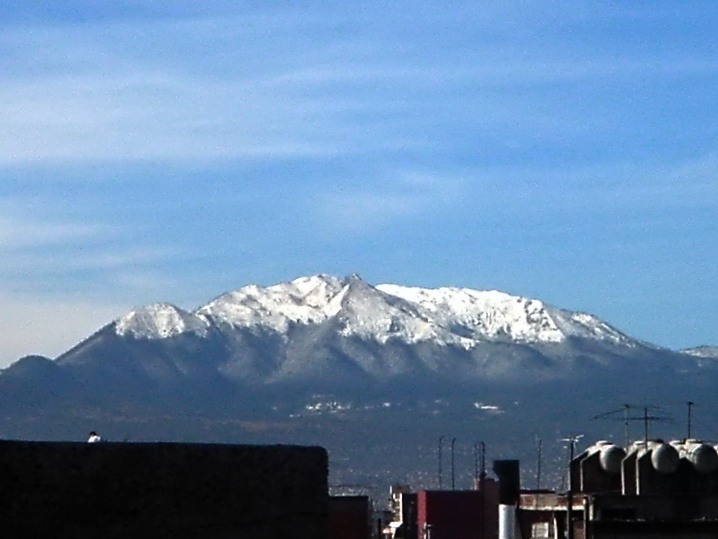
Snow-covered Ajusco volcano as seen from Colonia Narvarte in Mexico City

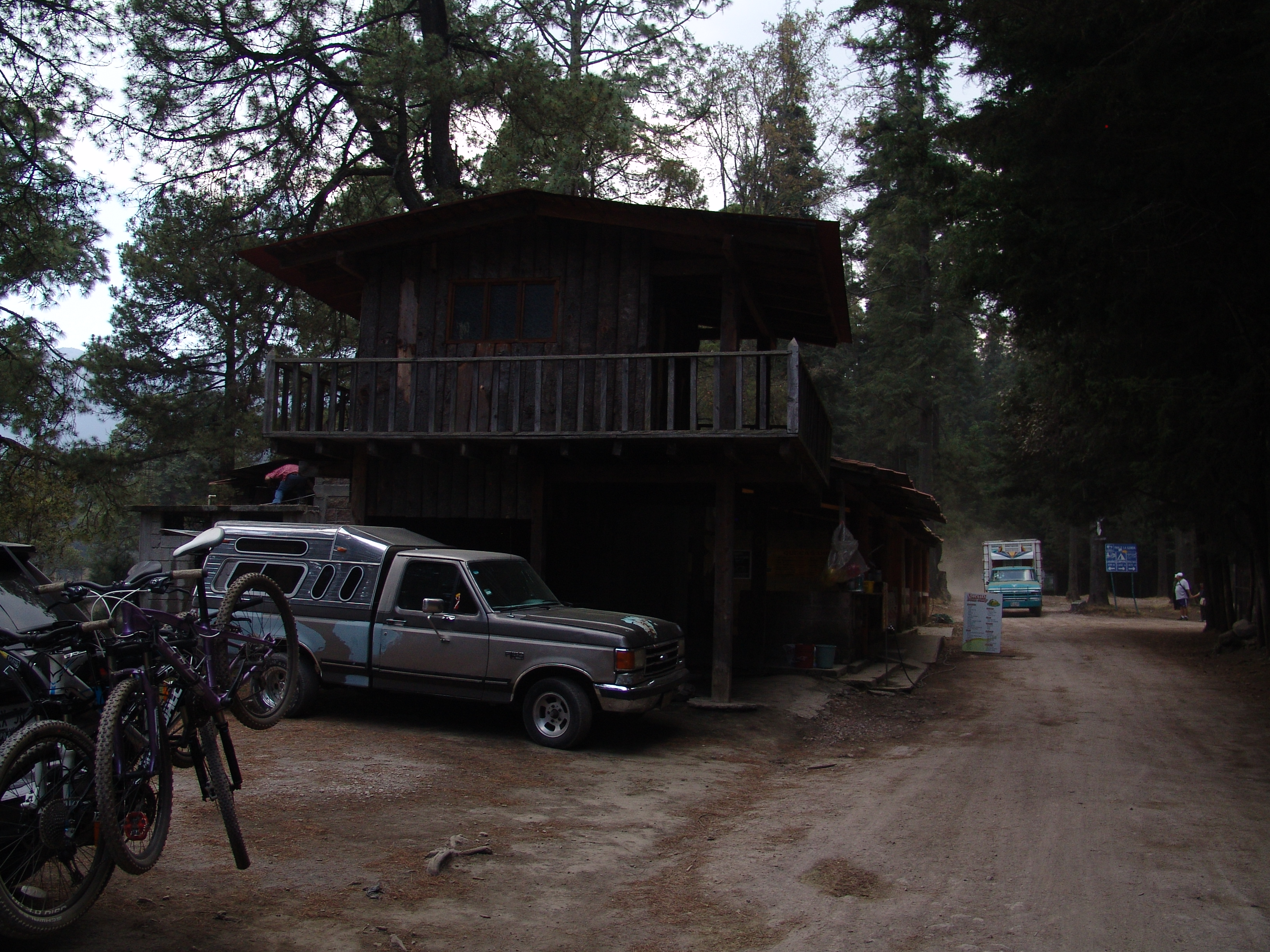
Paisaje del Ajuscos. (Tlalpan, Mexico City)

The area around the peak is a popular destination for residents of Mexico City and tourists, with activities such mountain biking, horseback riding, motorcycling, hiking and climbing. The area is one of the few around Mexico City where it may snow in the winter. This mountain offers views over the Valley of Mexico (weather and pollution permitting), including the city and its skyscrapers, Popocatepetl, Iztaccihuatl and Nevado de Toluca volcanoes, and parts of the Valley of Cuernavaca.

The Ajusco area is also home to Six Flags México (the largest amusement park in Latin America), the TV Azteca television network, the National Pedagogic University, the UNAM radio transmission center, the Fondo de Cultura Económica and El Colegio de México.

Atop the volcano is a pre-Hispanic site where artifacts have been discovered.
