= Thirteen Heavens =

Place in the Nahua people's cosmology

Before the Spanish Invasion, the Nahua people such as the Aztecs, Chichimecs and the Toltecs believed that the heavens were divided into multiple levels, either nine, twelve, or thirteen, depending on the group.. Each level contained different meteoreological, astronomical, or divine phenomena. In Book 10 of the Florentine Codex, we learn that the Toltecs "understood that there were many divisions of heaven; they said there were twelve layers [mahtlāctlanepanōlli omōme]." Yet Book 6 of the same ethnographic work relates that Aztec midwives would tell newborns after bathing them, "You were created in the place of duality [ Ōmeyōcān ], the place above the nine heavens. Your mother and father—Ōmetēuctli and Ōmecihuātl, the heavenly lady—formed you, created you."

== Aztec mythology ==
In Aztec mythology, heaven and earth were created by Quetzalcoatl and Tezcatlipoca, using the body of the primordial leviathan, Cipactli. After the heavens collapsed in a deluge at the end of the fourth age, Quetzalcoatl and Tezcatlipoca fashioned four sky bearers to help lift up the heavens in each of the cardinal directions. Then Quetzalcoatl and Tezcatlipoca transformed into two massive trees to sustain the heavens in their branches.

The most important of these heavens was Omeyocan, the Place of Duality, where dwells Ometeotl—the source of all creation, its male and female halves known as Ometeuctli (Two Lord) and Omecihuatl (Two Lady).

== Names of the Layers of Heaven ==
While Omeyocan is mentioned frequently in multiple sources, the only manuscript that lists the names of the other heavens is the Codex Vaticanus-A, in which the Nahuatl names are glossed in Italian.

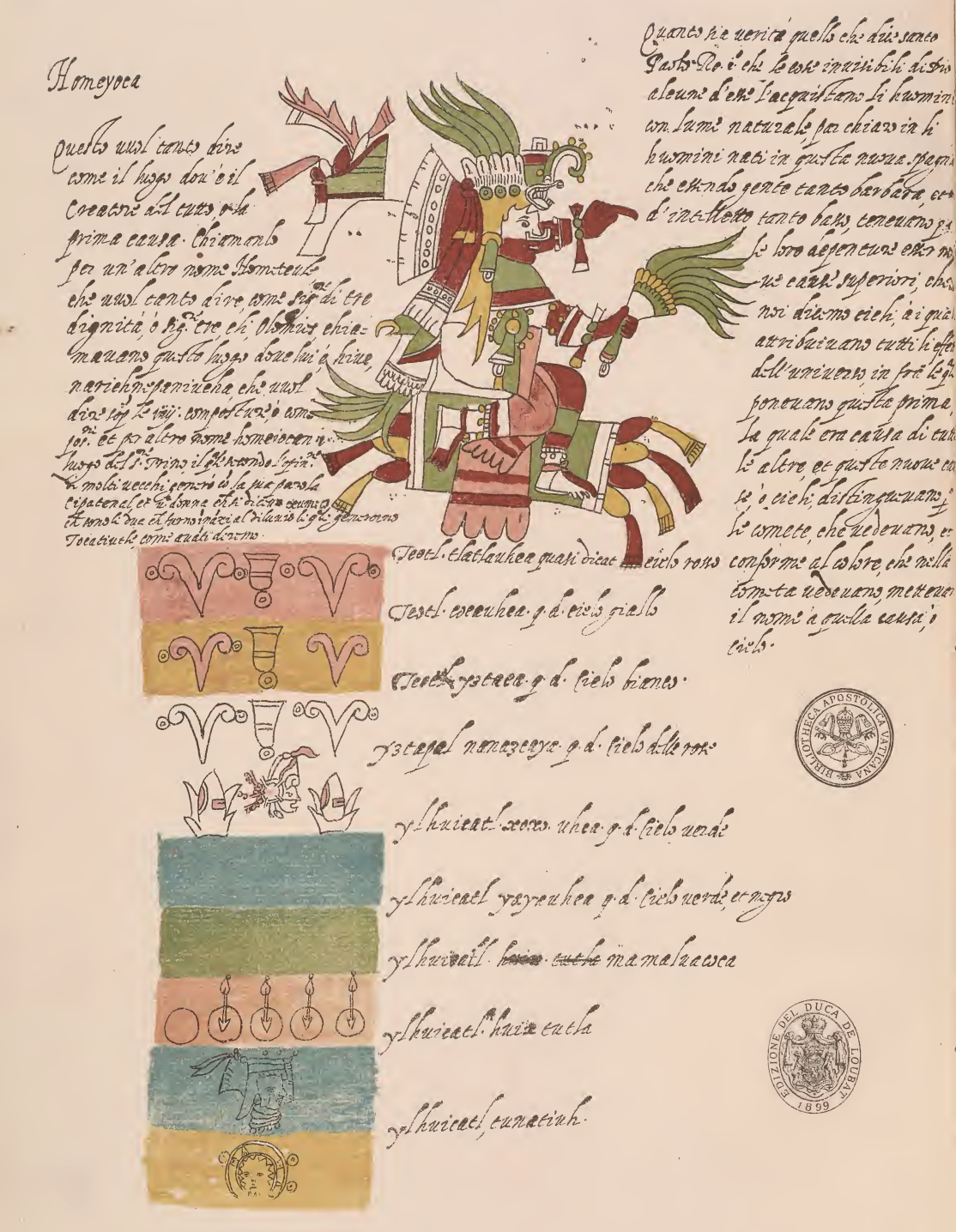
The first page in the Codex Vaticanus-A

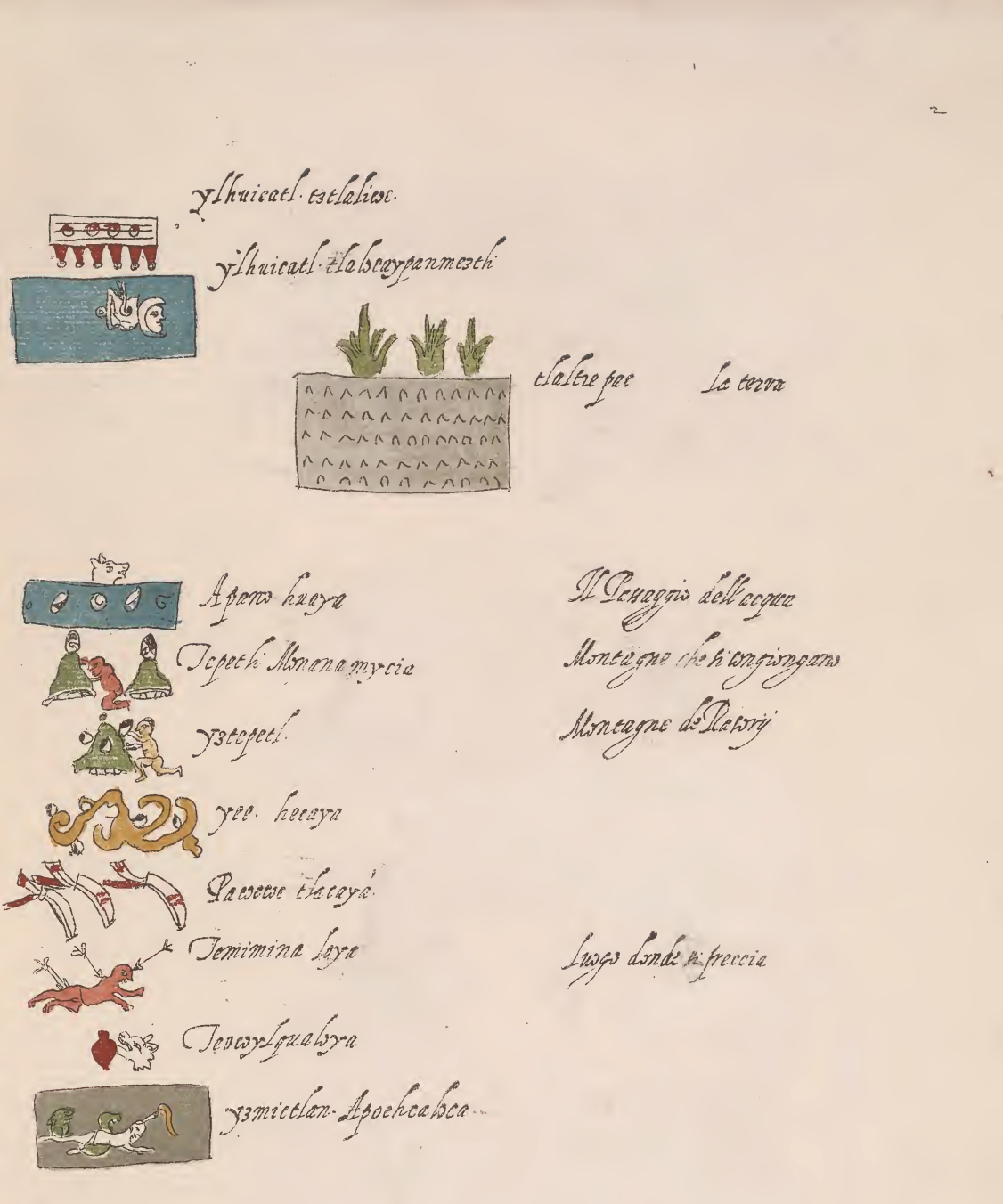
The second page in the Codex Vaticanus-A

In those first two pages of the codex, only twelve layers of heaven are listed:

1. Omeyocan—"Place of Duality"
2. Teotl Tlatlauhcan—"Place of the Red God"
3. Teotl Cozauhcan—"Place of the Golden God"
4. Teotl Iztaccan—"Place of the White God"
5. Itztapalnanatzcayan—"Place where obsidian flagstones crack"
6. Ilhuicatl Xoxohuiccan—"Dark blue/green heaven"
7. Ilhuicatl Yayauhcan—"Deep green/black heaven"
8. Ilhuicatl Mamalhuazcan—"Fire Drill constellation heaven"
9. Ilhuicatl Huixtohtlan—"Heaven of Huixtohcihuatl"
10. Ilhuicatl Tonatiuh—"Heaven of the sun"
11. Ilhuicatl Citlalinicue—"Heaven of the Milky Way"
12. Ilhuicatl Tlalocan-ipan-Metztli—"Heaven of Tlalocan and the moon"

In the mid-sixteenth century, French cleric André Thevet translated as Histoyre du Mechique the Tratado de antigüedades mexicanas, a now lost account of Aztec culture and religion written by Andrés Olmos. Thevet lists thirteen gods as pertaining to each of the thirteen heavens, though they are nearly identical (except for the thirteenth) to the Lords of the Day, the gods that preside over the numbers 1-13 that are paired with each of 20 nature names to form the 260 astrological day signs of the ritual tōnalpōhualli calendar.

1. Xiuhtecuhtli
2. Tlaltecuhtli
3. Chalchiuhtlicue
4. Tonatiuh
5. Tlazolteotl
6. Mictlantecuhtli
7. Centeotl
8. Tlaloc
9. Ehecatl
10. Tezcatlipoca
11. Mictecacihuatl
12. Tlahuizcalpantecuhtli
13. Ometeotl

However, none of the other codices describing the tonalpohualli assigns the Lords of the Day to a particular layer of heaven, not even the Codex Vaticanus-A, which gives us the names of those layers.

== Later Speculation about the Heavens ==
Though there is little primary source information about the contents or state of the heavens, some have continued to theorize and piece together possible clues to create a more complete hypothesis about the thirteen levels.

Thirteen Heavens
Name			Dwellers
1	Ilhuicatl-Meztli; Ilhuicatl-Tlalocan-Meztli; Ilhuicatl-Tlaloc-Meztli; Ilhuicatl-Tlalocan	"Sky where the moon moves"	Meztli, moon goddess (Moon).; As lunar phases; Tlazolteotl, goddess of lust and illicit affairs, patron of sexual incontinence, adultery, sex, passions, carnality and moral transgressions.; Tiacapan, one of the goddesses of sex; Ixcuina, one of the goddesses of sex; Tecotzin or Teicu, one of the goddesses of sex; Tlaloc, god of thunder, rain and the earth. In this layer, he pierces the "clouds' bellies" to make them rain.; Ehecatl, god of the wind. In this layer, he blows the clouds with his breath (breezes) to make them move.; The Ehecatotontli, gods of the breezes.; Mictlanpachecatl, god of the north wind.; Cihuatecayotl, god of the west wind.; Tlalocayotl, god of the east wind.; Huitztlampaehecatl, god of the south wind.; Here the moon and the clouds are in motion.
2	Ilhuicatl-Tetlaliloc; Ilhuicatl-Cintlalco	"Where the stars move"	Citlalicue, goddess who created the stars along with her husband (Milky Way).; Citlalatonac, god who created the stars along with his wife (Milky Way).; Constellations; Citlaxonecuilli (Ursa Major).; Citlaltlachtli (Orion).; Citlalcolotl (Scorpius).; Citlalozomahtli (Cepheus, Ursa Minor and Draco).; Citlalmiquiztli (Sagittarius and Corona Australis).; Citlalhuitzitzilin (Columba and Lepus).; Citlalmazatl (Eridanus and Fornax).; Citlalolli (Leo).; Citlalcuetzpalli (Andromeda and Pegasus).; Citlaltecpatl (Piscis Austrinus and Crane).; Citlalxonecuilli (Auriga and Perseus).; Tianquiztli (Pleiades).; The two armies of stars; Centzon Mimixcoa, gods of the northern stars.; Centzon Huitznahuac, gods of the southern stars.; Here the stars are in motion.
3	Ilhuicatl-Tonatiuh	"Where the Sun moves"	Tonatiuh, god of the Fifth Sun.; Nanahuatzin, another god of the sun, constantly sacrificing himself in a burning fire so that the sun could continue to shine around the world, with Tonatiuh taking his place.; Western abode of the yellow god, to where the sun travels before submerging into the Mictlan underworld.
4	Ilhuicatl-Huitztlan	"The sky of the Big Star"	Tlahuizcalpantecuhtli, god of dawn and the morning star Citlalpol or Hueycitlalin (Venus). Associated with Quetzalcoatl.; Huixtocihuatl, goddess of salt.; The way of Venus.
5	Ilhuicatl-Mamaloaco	"Sky that is sinking or being drilled"	Citlalicue, goddess of female stars (Milky Way).; Citlalatonac, god of female stars (Milky Way).; Here the comets (called citlallinpopoca or also citlalmina or xihuitl, depending on their shape) are in motion.
6	Ilhuicatl-Yayauhco	"Dark green space"	Tezcatlipoca, god of providence, of the material, of the intangible and ubiquity, patron of Ursa major and the night, ruler of the North.; Place from where the night comes and spreads.
7	Ilhuicatl-Xoxoauhco; Ilhuicatl-Xoxoco; Ilhuicatl-Xoxoauhqui	"Region of blue"	Huitzilopochtli, god of the sun and will, patron of war and its tactics, of battles and fire, ruler of the South.; Here the sun shows its face at dawn. Sky that is seeing during the day.
8	Ilhuicatl-Nanatzcayan; Ilhuicatl-Itzapan-Nanatzcayan	"Where the obsidian knives are creaking"	Mictlantecuhtli, god of death and ruler of Mictlan (the Underworld).; Mictecacihuatl, goddess of death and ruler of Mictlan (the Underworld).; Itztlacoliuhqui, god of darkness, storms, disasters and frost.; Sacrifice gods; Itzpapalotltotec, god of sacrifice; Itzpapalotlcihuatl, goddess of sacrifice; Tlaloc, god of thunder, rain and the earth. He is also a fertility god.; Place of storms. Heavenly abode of the god of death, from where the darkness comes.
9	Ilhuicatl-Teoiztac; Ilhuicatl-Teoixtac	"Region of white"	Quetzalcoatl, god of life, of light, of wisdom, of fertility and knowledge, patron of the winds and the day, ruler of the West.; Tzitzimime, stellar spirits.; Abode of the white god and stellar spirits.
10	Ilhuicatl-Teocozauhco	"Region of yellow"	Tonatiuh, god of the Fifth Sun.; Eastern abode of the Yellow God, where he comes from and goes to the west.
11	Ilhuicatl-Teotlatlauhco; Ilhuicatl-Teotlauhco	"Region of red"	Xiuhtecuhtli, god of fire.; Chantico, goddess of fire, homes and volcanoes.; The Xiuhtotontli, gods of fire (alternative manifestations or states of Xiuhtecuhtli).; Xiuhiztacuhqui, god of the white fire.; Xiuhtlatlauhqui, god of the red fire.; Xiuhcozauhqui, god of the yellow fire.; Xiuhxoxoauhqui, god of the blue fire.; Abode of the red god. Red sky with rays of light to express that the first creation of the world was the earthly fire.
12	Ilhuicatl-Teteocan	"Sky that is the place of the gods"	Quetzalcoatl (East); Xipe Totec (West); Tezcatlipoca (North); Huitzilopochtli (South); Abode of the gods. Ruled by the Four Creator Lords or Tezcatlipocas. Eminently divine place where the deities remain and project themselves to be in other places. Where the gods take on faces, and where they put on masks to become others while still being themselves. Where they are born, reborn, and fed in their quality of eternal and mutating beings.
13	Ilhuicatl-Omeyocan	"Place of Two", "Place of Duality"	Ometeotl, gods of duality.; Ometecuhtli, originating god of sustenance, of the furtive, of the inert and the inherent, patron of maintenance and ruler of the cycle of life.; Omecihuatl, originating goddess of sustenance, of the furtive, of the inert and the inherent, patron of maintenance and ruler of the cycle of life.; The alternatives; Tonacatecuhtli (Ometecuhtli).; Tonacacihuatl (Omecihuatl).; Residence or mansion of the creator couple; source of the gods and the creation of the universe, where the generating principle of all that exists is conceived.

== See also ==
- Aztec mythology
- Aztec philosophy
- List of Aztec gods and supernatural beings

== General and cited references ==
- Garibay Kintana, Ángel Maria, ed. (1965). Teogonía e historia de los mexicanos: tres opúsculos del siglo xvi. Mexico City: Editorial Porrúa. ISBN 9789684323124.
- Cecilio Agustín Robelo (1905). Diccionario de Mitología Nahua (in Spanish). México: Biblioteca Porrúa. Imprenta del Museo Nacional de Arqueología, Historia y Etnología. p. 851. ISBN 978-9684327955.
- "Vat.lat.3738". DigiVatLib. Biblioteca Apostolica Vaticana.
