= Mictla =

Mictla may refer to:

- Mictlan, an Aztec underworld
- Mictlantecuhtli, the king of Mictlan
- Mictecacihuatl, the queen of Mictlan
