= Tlāhuizcalpantecuhtli =

Aztec god of the morning star

Tlāhuizcalpantēcuhtli
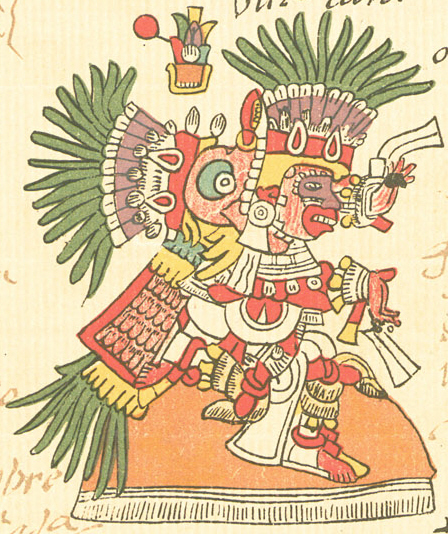
- Tlāhuizcalpantēuctli, as depicted on page 14 of the Codex Telleriano-Remensis. The sign above him is the year 1 Reed in the Aztec calendar
- Gender: male

Tlāhuizcalpantēcuhtli [t͡ɬaːwisˈkaɬpanteːˈkʷt͡ɬi] is a principal member of the pantheon of gods within the Aztec religion, representing the Morning Star Venus. The name comes from the Nahuatl words tlāhuizcalpan [t͡ɬaːwisˈkaɬpan] "dawn" and tēcuhtli [ˈteːkʷt͡ɬi] "lord". Tlahuizcalpantecuhtli is one of the thirteen Lords of the Day, representing the 12th day of the Aztec trecena.

== Origin story ==
Tlahuizcalpantecuhtli plays a significant role in the creation of Tonatiuh, the Fifth Sun in the Aztec creation narrative.

Motolinía's Memoriales, and the Codex Chimalpopoca relate that the Toltec ruler Topiltzin Quetzalcoatl became the morning star when he died. Quetzalcoatl throws himself into a bonfire after adorning his regalia. Once he started burning, his ashes were lifted and various beautiful birds were sacrificed until Quetzalcoatl's spirit leaves his heart as a star and becomes a part of the sky.

The Annals of Cuauhtitlan gives his year of death as 1 Reed, one 52-year calendar cycle from his birth.

In the second section of the Codex Chimalpopoca (called Legend of the Suns), Tlahuizcalpantecuhtli becomes angry when Tonatiuh, the sun god, does not move across the sky after being created. He shoots Tonatiuh with atlatl darts, but misses and is hit by Tonatiuh's darts, being transformed into the god of obsidian and coldness, Itztlacoliuhqui. The rest of the gods present: Tezcatlipoca, Huitzilopochtli, Nochpalliicue, Yapallicue and Xochiquetzal sacrifice themselves in Teotihuacan to make the Sun move across the sky, starting the contemporary era.

Tlahuizcalpantecuhtli is also viewed as one of the four gods who kept the sky up and was associated with the cardinal direction East.

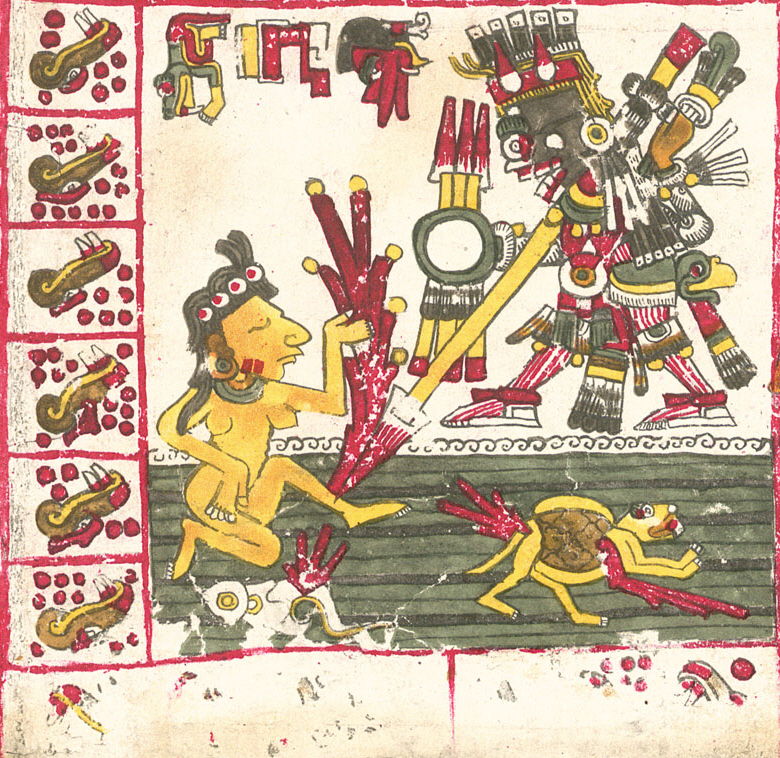
Tlahuizcalpantecuhtli wounding a woman on page 53 of the Codex Borgia. (Click to enlarge)

== Effects ==
Tlahuizcalpantecuhtli is believed to cause harm to people by shooting darts. According to the Annals of Cuauhtitlan, after Topiltzin Quetzalcoatl died, he spent four days in Mictlan making darts before emerging as the morning star.

The Annals list his victims according to the days of the Aztec calendar: old people on 1 Alligator; small children on 1 Jaguar, 1 Deer and 1 Flower; nobles on 1 Reed; everybody on 1 Death; and young people on 1 Movement. On 1 Rain, he shoots the rain, so that no rain falls, and on 1 Water, he causes drought.

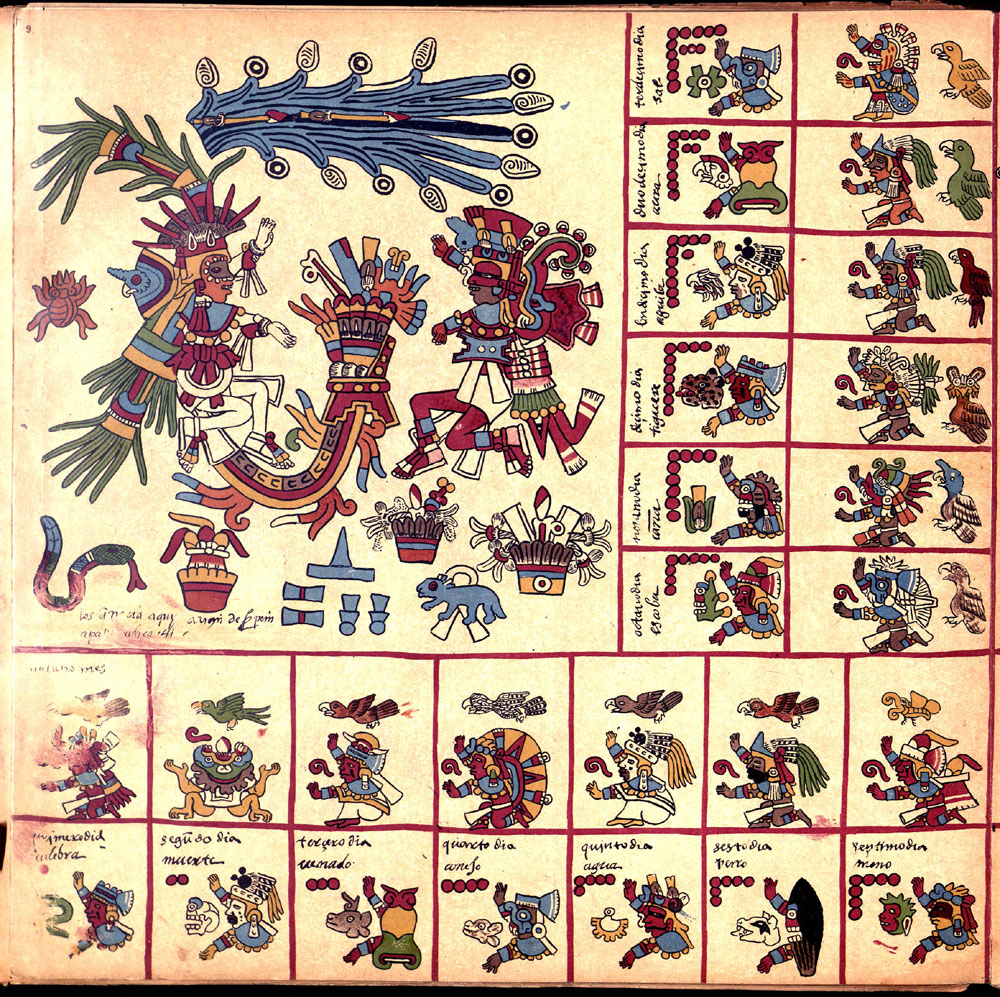
Tlahuizcalpantecuhtli (left) and Xiuhtecuhtli (right), surrounded by the signs of their trecena, on page 9 of the Codex Borbonicus. (Click to enlarge.)

== Calendar ==
Along with being the Lord of the 12th day, in the sacred Aztec calendar called the Tōnalpōhualli Tlahuizcalpantecuhtli is patron of the trecena beginning with the day 1 Snake and ending with 13 Movement. In this he is paired with Xiuhtecuhtli, the god of fire.

== Gallery ==
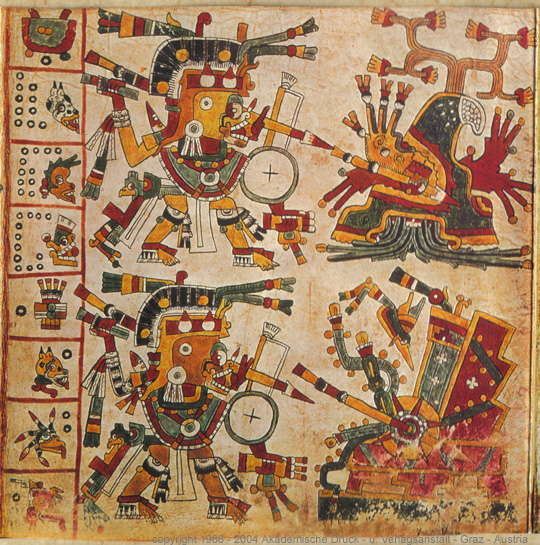
Tlahuizcalpantecuhtli depicted on page 10 in the Codex Cospi

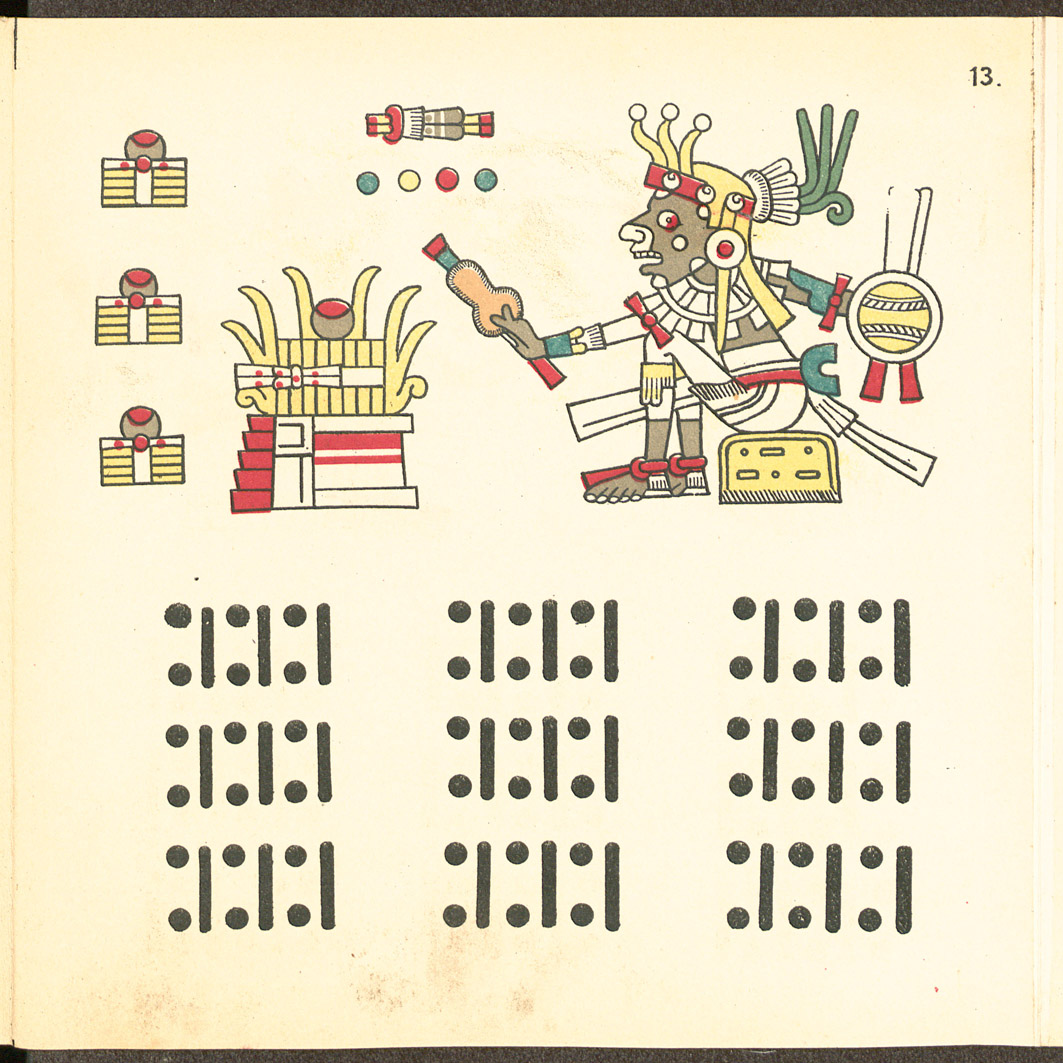
Page 13 of the Codex Fejéváry-Mayer, a divination calendar, depicting Tlahuitzcalpanrecuhtli
