= Tōnacācihuātl =

Central deity in Aztec religion

Tonacacihuatl
- Goddess of the Creation
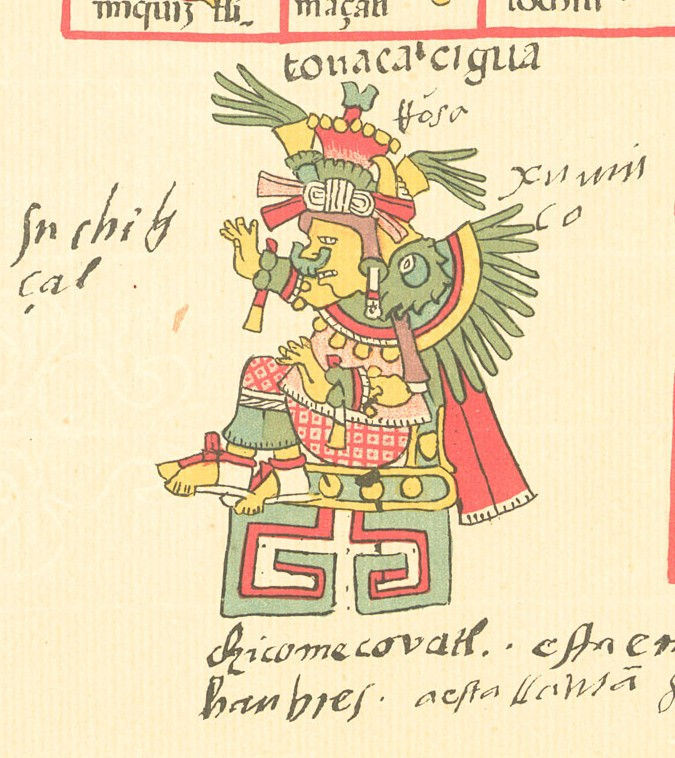
- Tōnacācihuātl as depicted in the Codex Telleriano-Remensis
- Other names: Ometeotl, Omecihuatl, Citlalcueitl
- Abode: Omeyocan (Thirteenth Heaven)
- Gender: Female
- Region: Mesoamerica
- Ethnic group: Aztec, Tlaxcaltec, Toltec (Nahoa)

Genealogy
- Parents: None (self-created)
- Siblings: None
- Consort: Tonacatecuhtli (Codex Zumarraga)
- Children: • With Ometecuhtli: Xipe-Totec, Tezcatlipoca, Quetzalcoatl, Huitzilopochtli (Codex Zumarraga) • By fecund action: the 1,600 gods Nauhtzonteteo (Tecpatl)

In Aztec mythology, Tōnacācihuātl (Nahuatl pronunciation: [toːnakaːˈsiwaːt͡ɬ]) was a creator and goddess of fertility, worshiped for peopling the earth and making it fruitful. Most Colonial-era manuscripts equate her with Ōmecihuātl. Tōnacācihuātl was the consort of Tōnacātēcuhtli. She is also referred to as Ilhuicacihuātl or "Heavenly Lady."

Tonacacihuatl is depicted in the Codex Telleriano-Remensis.

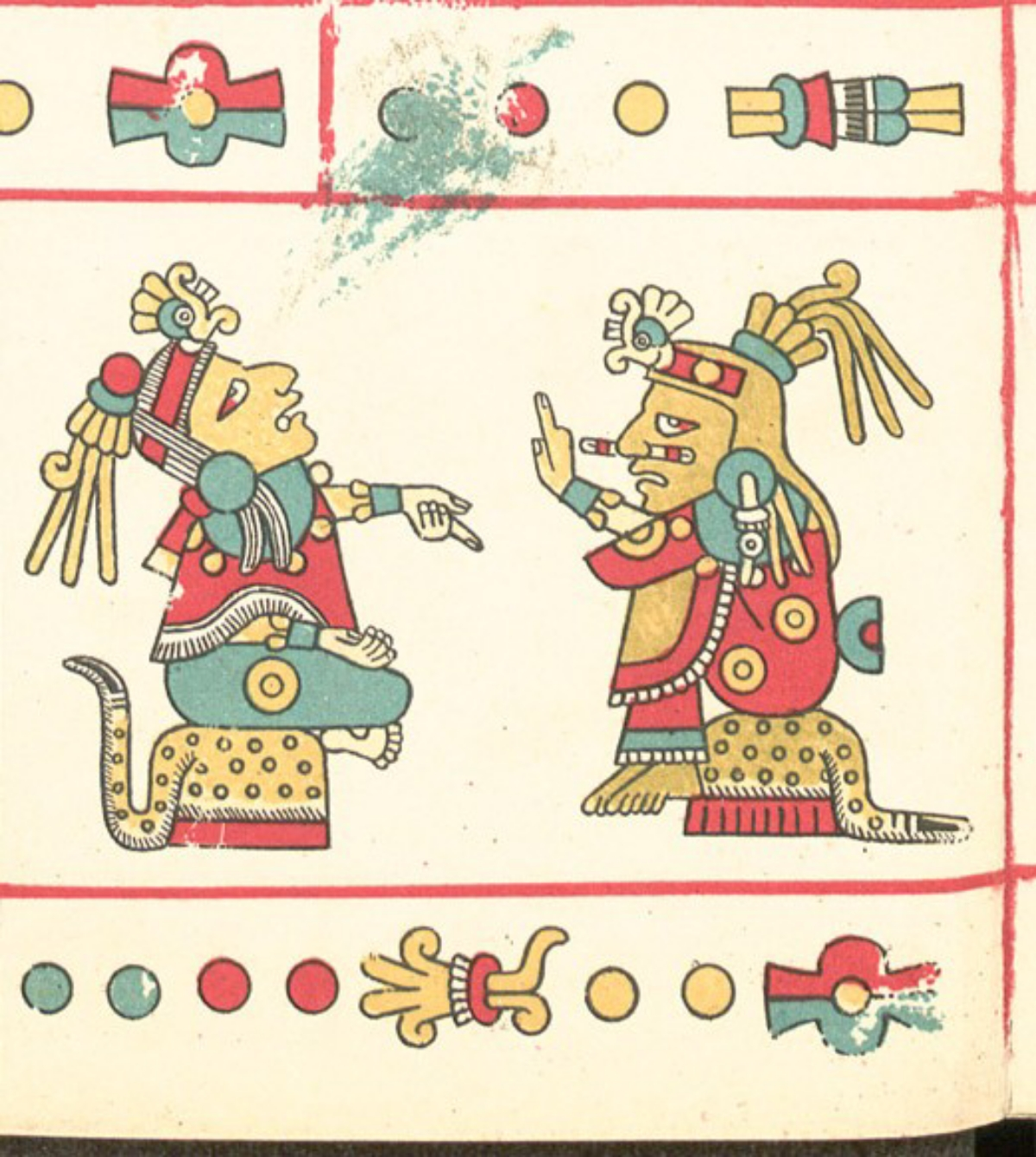
Tonacacíhuatl and Tonacatecuhtli as depicted in the Codex Fejérváry-Mayer.

== Etymology ==
The god's name is a compound of two Nahuatl words: tōnacā and cihuātl. While cihuātl can be translated "woman" or "lady", tōnacā presents several possible interpretations. Some read this root as tonacā (without the long 'o'), consisting of nacatl, meaning "human flesh" or "food", with the possessive prefix to ("our"). By this etymology, Tōnacācihuātl would mean "Lady of Our Food" or "Lady of Our Flesh", most commonly rendered "Lady of Our Sustenance." The word tōnac simply means "abundance", giving Tōnacācihuātl the alternate reading "Lady of Abundance."

== Origin and role ==
Tōnacācihuātl was the Central Mexican form of the creator goddess common to Mesoamerican religions. According to the Codex Ríos, the History of the Mexicans as Told by Their Paintings, the Histoyre du Mechique, and the Florentine Codex, Tōnacācihuātl and her counterpart Tōnacātēcuhtli resided in Ōmeyōcān, the 13th, highest heaven, from which human souls descended to earth. Tōnacācihuātl is associated with procreation, appearing in pre-Columbian art near copulating humans. In the Florentine Codex, Sahagún relates that Aztec midwives would tell newborns after bathing them, "You were created in the place of duality, the place above the nine heavens. Your mother and father—Ōmetēuctli and Ōmecihuātl, the heavenly lady—formed you, created you."

In 1629, Hernando Ruiz de Alarcón also reported the use of the goddess's name in ritual planting prayers, in which a seed of corn is entrusted to the earth deity Tlaltecuhtli by a shaman who calls the kernel nohueltiuh Tōnacācihuātl ("my sister, the Lady of Abundance").

In the Codex Chimalpopoca, Tōnacātēcuhtli and Tōnacācihuātl are listed as one of several pairs of gods to whom Quetzalcoatl prays.

== Nauhtzonteteo ==
Ometecuhtli and Omecihuatl, or Tonacatecuhtli and Tonacacihuatl govern the divine nature divided into two gods (it is convenient to know man and woman; the man, who created and governed everything that is of the masculine gender and the woman everything that belonged to the feminine gender). Omecihuatl, for her part, gave birth to many children on the Thirteen Heavens with Ometecuhtli, and after all these births she had given birth to a flint, which in their language they call tecpatl, from which the other gods were amazed and frightened, their children agreed to throw it out of the heavens to the said flint, and thus they put into action, and that it fell in a certain part of the earth, called Chicomoztoc, which means 'Seven Caves', and that then one thousand and six hundred gods and goddesses came out of it, the Nauhtzonteteo that spread over the face of the earth, the sea, the underworld, and the heavens.
