= Lords of the Day =

Aztec mythology belief

In Aztec mythology the Lords of the Day (Classical Nahuatl: Tonalteuctin) are a set of thirteen gods who ruled over a particular number, from one to thirteen. When combined with one of twenty day signs related to natural phenomena, those numbers give the names of the 260 days in the sacred calendar or tonalpohualli, from 1-Dog through 13-Water. They were cyclical, so that the same god ruled over the fate of the day with their number every thirteen days.

According to the 16th-century French manuscript Histoyre du Mechique, each of these gods also corresponded to one of the thirteen heavens. In the Aztec calendar, the lords of the day are:

- Xiuhtecuhtli, god of fire and time.
- Tlaltecuhtli, goddess of the earth.
- Chalchiuhtlicue, goddess of water, lakes, rivers, seas, streams, horizontal waters, storms and baptism.
- Tonatiuh, god of the sun.
- Tlazolteotl, goddess of lust, carnality, sexual misdeeds.
- Mictlantecuhtli, god of the underworld.
- Centeotl, god of maize. Also recognized as Chicomecoatl, goddess of agriculture.
- Tlaloc, god of the thunder, rain and earthquakes.
- Ehecatl, Lord of wind, life giver, who breaths life into being and moves the sun, the god created love for his lover Mayahuel, an important aspect of Quetzalcoatl, the lord of the West.
- Tezcatlipoca, god of providence, matter and the invisible, ruler of the night, Great Bear, impalpable, ubiquity and the twilight, the lord of the North.
- Mictecacihuatl, goddess of the underworld.
- Tlahuizcalpantecuhtli, Lord of the House of Dawn, the morning star, Venus, an important aspect of Quetzalcoatl.
- Citlalicue, goddess of the female stars (Milky Way).

The Codex Borgia associates a series of birds with each of the gods:

1. Huiztilin (humming-bird)
2. Quetzalhuiztilin (green hummingbird)
3. Huactli (hawk)
4. Zolin (quail)
5. Cuauhtli (eagle)
6. Chicuatli (screech owl)
7. Papalotl (butterfly)
8. Tlotli (hawk eagle)
9. Huexolotl (turkey)
10. Tecolotl (owl)
11. Alotl (macaw)
12. Quetzal (Resplendant Quetzal)
13. Toznene (parrot)

== General and cited references ==
- Codex Borgia : Biblioteca apostolica vaticana (Cod. Borg. Messicano 1). Karl Anton Nowotny, Biblioteca apostolica vaticana, Jay I. Kislak Collection (Vollständige Faksimile-Ausg. des Codex im Originalformat ed.). Graz, Austria: Akadem. Druck-u. Verlagsanstalt. 1976. p. 45. ISBN 3-201-00964-4. OCLC 3706318.
- Garibay Kintana, Ángel Maria, ed. (1965). Teogonía e historia de los mexicanos: tres opúsculos del siglo xvi. Mexico City: Editorial Porrúa. ISBN 9789684323124.
