= Tōnacātēcuhtli =

Central deity in Aztec religion

Tonacatecuhtli
- God of the Creation
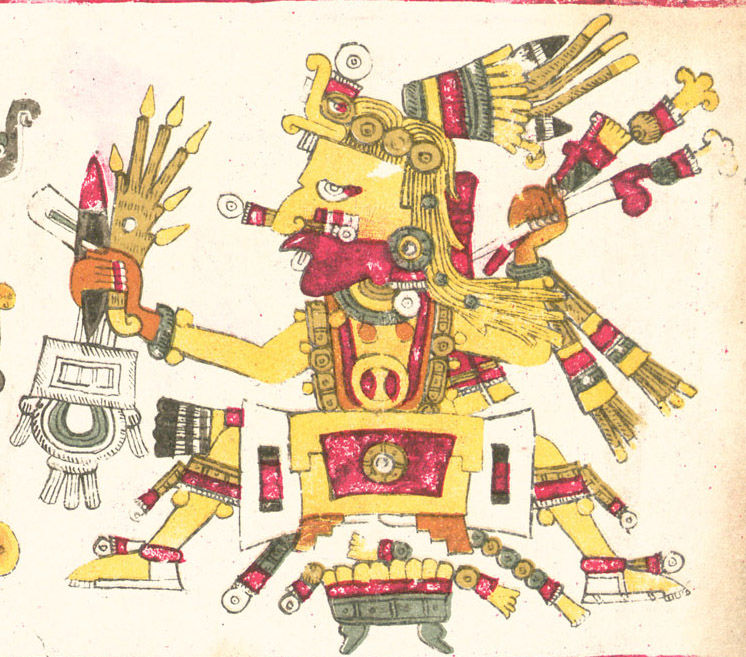
- Tōnacātēcuhtli as depicted in the Codex Borgia
- Other names: Ometeotl, Ometecuhtli, Citlaltonac
- Abode: Omeyocan (Thirteenth Heaven)
- Gender: Male
- Region: Mesoamerica
- Ethnic group: Aztec (Nahua)

Genealogy
- Parents: None (self-created)
- Siblings: None
- Consort: Tonacacihuatl
- Children: Xipe-Totec, Tezcatlipoca, Quetzalcoatl, Huitzilopochtli (Codex Zumarraga)

In Aztec mythology, Tonacatecuhtli was a creator and fertility god, worshipped for populating the earth and making it fruitful. Most Colonial-era manuscripts equate him with Ōmetēcuhtli. His consort was Tonacacihuatl.

Tonacateuchtli is depicted in the Codex Borgia.

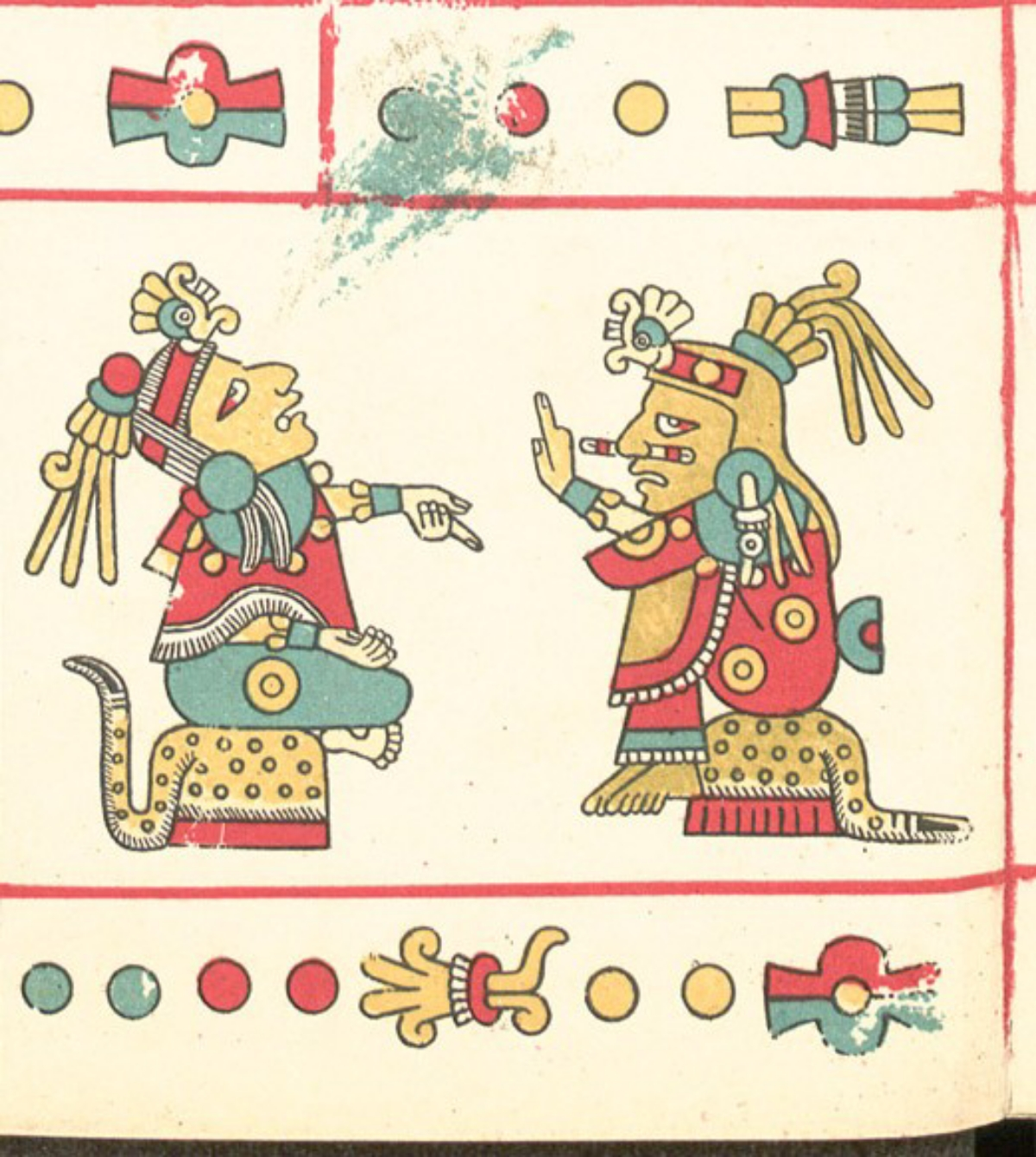
Tonacacíhuatl and Tonacatecuhtli as depicted in the Codex Fejérváry-Mayer.

== Etymology ==
The god's name is a compound of two Nahuatl words: tōnacā and tēcuhtli. While tēcuhtli is generally translated "lord", tōnacā presents several possible interpretations. Some read this root as tonacā (without the long 'o'), consisting of nacatl, meaning "human flesh" or "food", with the possessive prefix to ("our"). By this etymology, Tonacātēcuhtli would mean "Lord of Our Food" or "Lord of Our Flesh", most commonly rendered "Lord of Our Sustenance." The word tōnac simply means "abundance", giving Tōnacātēcuhtli the alternate reading "Lord of Abundance".

== Origin and role ==
Tōnacātēcuhtli was the Central Mexican form of the aged creator god common to Mesoamerican religion. According to the Codex Ríos, the History of the Mexicans as Told by Their Paintings, the Histoyre du Mechique, and the Florentine Codex, Tōnacātēcuhtli and his consort Tōnacācihuātl resided in "in Tōnacātēuctli īchān" ("the mansion of the Lord of Abundance"), also known as Omeyocan, the 13th, highest heaven, from which human souls descended to earth. Tōnacātēcuhtli is associated with procreation, appearing in pre-Columbian art near copulating humans. In the Florentine Codex, Sahagún relates that Aztec midwives would tell newborns after bathing them, "You were created in the place of duality, the place above the nine heavens. Your father and mother—Ōmetēuctli and Ōmecihuātl, the heavenly woman—formed you, created you."

In terms of the Aztec calendar, Tōnacātēcuhtli was the patron of Cipactli, the first of the twenty days in a month, as well as presiding over the trecena (thirteen-day ritual week) named 1 Cipactli (itself the first of the trecenas).

In the Codex Chimalpopoca, Tōnacātēcuhtli and Tōnacācihuātl are listed as one of several pairs of gods to whom Quetzalcoatl prays.

He turned the goddess Quaxolotl into a dog when she offended him.
