= Ōmeyōcān =

Mockotain

Omeyocan (Nahuatl pronunciation: [oːmeˈjoːkaːn]) is the highest of thirteen heavens in Aztec mythology, the dwelling place of Ometeotl, the dual god comprising Ometecuhtli and Omecihuatl.

== Etymology ==
In Nahuatl, ōmeyōcān means "the place of duality." The word is composed of ōme ('two') and -yō (suffix for abstractions), which gives ōmeyōtl or duality; and -cān (place).

== Description ==
Multiple Nahuatl sources, notably the Florentine Codex, name the highest level of heaven Ōmeyōcān or "place of duality" (Sahagún specifically terms it "in ōmeyōcān in chiucnāuhnepaniuhcān" or "the place of duality, above the nine-tired heavens)." In the Histoyre du Mechique, Franciscan priest André Thevet translated a Nahuatl source reporting that in this layer of heaven there existed "a god named Ometecuhtli, which means two-gods, and one of them was a goddess." According to the Codex Ríos, the History of the Mexicans as Told by Their Paintings, the Histoyre du Mechique, and the Florentine Codex, the goddess of fertility and creation Tōnacācihuātl and her counterpart Tōnacātēcuhtli resided in Ōmeyōcān, creating human souls and sending them to earth. Sahagún clarifies that their names are epithets of Ōmetēcuhtli (literally "two-lord") and Ōmecihuātl ("two-lady"), giving as an alternate name of Ōmeyōcān "in tōnacātēcuhtli īchān" ("the mansion of Tōnacātēcuhtli").

There is some evidence that these two gods were considered aspects of a single being, as when a singer in Cantares Mexicanos asks where he can go given that "ōme ihcac yehhuān Dios" ("they, God, stand double"). The History of the Mexicans as Told by Their Paintings reports of the two that "se criaron [sic] y estuvieron siempre en el treceno cielo, de cuyo principio no se supo jamás, sino de su estada y creación, que fue en el treceno cielo" (they created themselves and had always been in the thirteenth heaven; nothing was ever known of their beginning, just their dwelling and creation, which were in the thirteenth heaven). In the Florentine Codex, Sahagún relates that Aztec midwives would tell newborns after bathing them, "You were created in the place of duality, the place above the nine heavens. Your mother and father—Ōmetēcuhtli and Ōmecihuātl, the heavenly lady—formed you, created you."

A song from the Historia Tolteca-Chichimeca mentions "ay ōmeteōtl ya tēyōcoyani," literally "two-god, creator of humanity." And the Codex Rios says of Omeyocan: "“This means the place where the creator of all thing—or the First Cause—exists. They also name it Hometeule”. "Teule" is a common Spanish misspelling of "teotl."

Many scholars (most notably Miguel León-Portilla) interpret this name "Ōmeteōtl" as "Dual God" or "Lord of the Duality," seeing it as a fusion of Ōmetēcuhtli and Ōmecihuātl, existing primordially in Ōmeyōcān. León-Portilla further argues that Ometeotl was the supreme creator deity of the Aztecs, and that the Aztecs envisioned this deity as a mystical entity with a dual nature akin to the Christian concept of the trinity.

== See also ==
- Aztec mythology
- Aztec philosophy
