= Ōmeteōtl =

Aztec dual deity

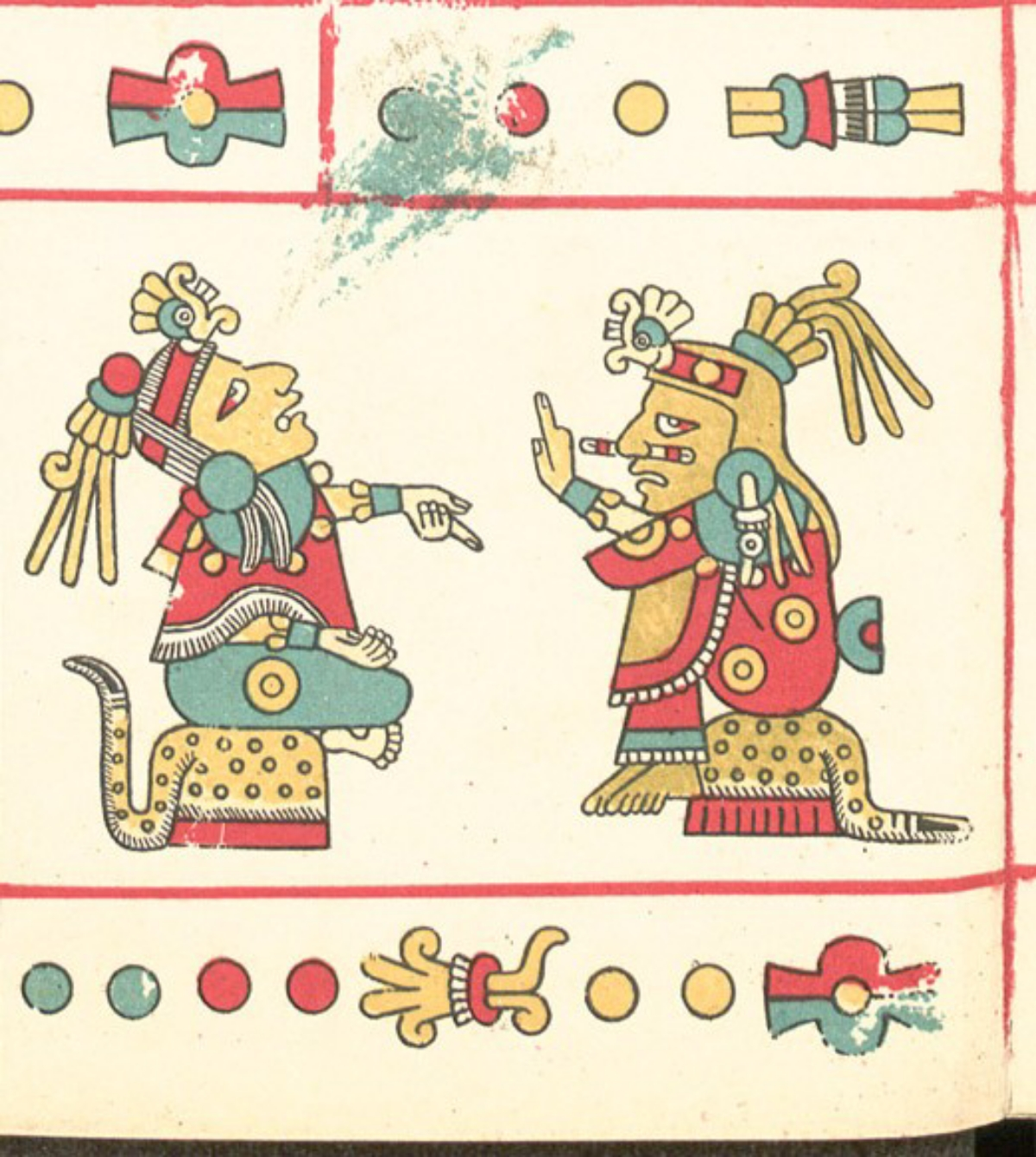
Tonacacíhuatl and Tonacatecuhtli as depicted in the Codex Fejérváry-Mayer

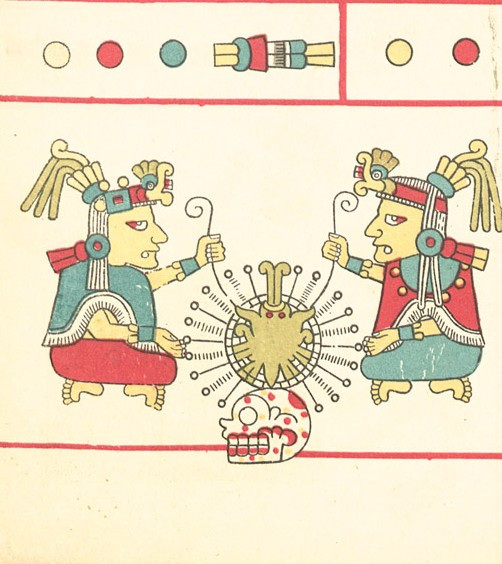
Ometecuhtli and Omecihuatl described in the Codex Fejérváry-Mayer

Ōmeteōtl (Nahuatl pronunciation: [oːmeˈteoːt͡ɬ]) ("Two-God") is a name used to refer to the pair of Aztec deities Ometecuhtli and Omecihuatl, also known as Tōnacātēcuhtli and Tonacacihuatl. Ōme translates as "two" or "dual" in Nahuatl and teōtl translates as "Divinity". Ometeotl was one as the first divinity, and Ometecuhtli and Omecihuatl when the being became two to be able to reproduce all creation.

== Definition ==
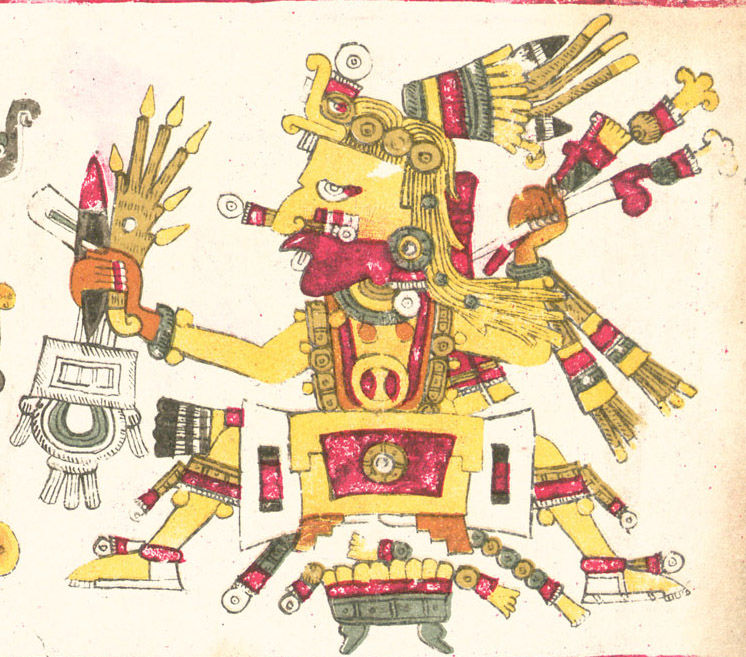
Tonacateuchtli as depicted in the Codex Borgia

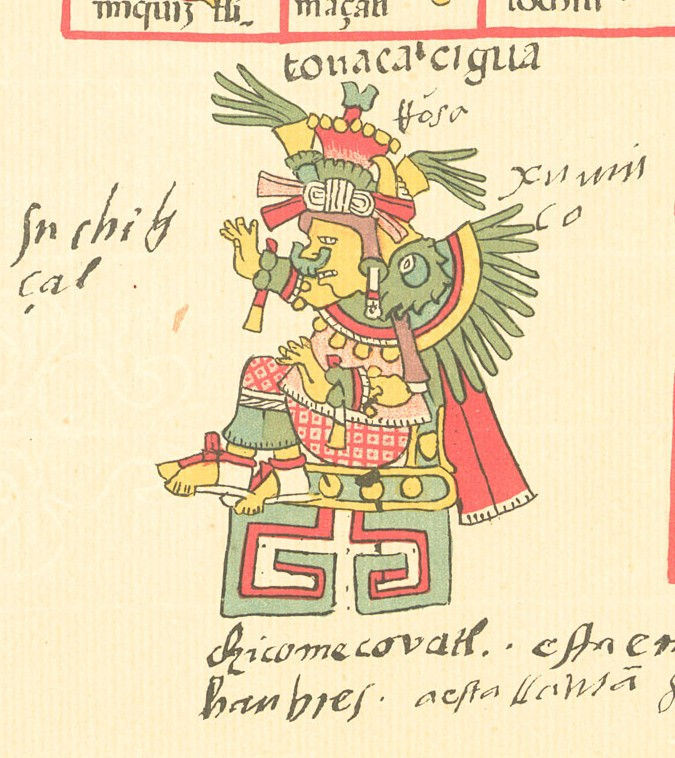
Tonacacihuatl as depicted in the Codex Telleriano-Remensis

Multiple Nahuatl sources, notably the Florentine Codex, name the highest level of heaven Ōmeyōcān or "place of duality" (Sahagún specifically terms it "in ōmeyōcān in chiucnāuhnepaniuhcān" or "the place of duality, above the nine-tiered heavens)." In the Histoyre du Mechique, Franciscan priest André Thevet translated a Nahuatl source reporting that in this layer of heaven there existed "a god named Ometecuhtli, which means two-gods, and one of them was a goddess." The History of the Mexicans as Told by Their Paintings (Historia de los mexicanos por sus pinturas) names the inhabitants of the uppermost heaven Tōnacātēcuhtli and Tonacacihuatl (Lord and Lady of Abundance). Sahagún concurs that these are epithets of "in ōmetēuctli in ōmecihuātl", giving as another name of ōmeyōcān "in tōnacātēuctli īchān" ("the mansion of the Lord of Abundance").

There is some evidence that these two gods were considered aspects of a single being, as when a singer in the Cantares Mexicanos asks where he can go given that "ōme ihcac yehhuān Dios" ("they, God, stand double"). The Historia de los Mexicanos por sus pinturas reports of the two that "se criaron y estuvieron siempre en el treceno cielo, de cuyo principio no se supo jamás, sino de su estada y creación, que fue en el treceno cielo" (they were raised and had always been in the thirteenth heaven; nothing was ever known of their beginning, just their dwelling and creation, which were in the thirteenth heaven).

As for direct use of the term, in a hymn transcribed in the Historia Tolteca-Chichimeca, we get this double-standing god's name. The sacred song contains the following line: "Ōmeteōtl in tēyōcoyani," meaning "Two-god, the people-creator."

Another appearance of the name Ometeotl comes in the Codex Vaticanus A (3738), where the twelve layers of heaven are described. The twelfth heaven is labeled "Homeyoca" (Omeyocan), and it features a divine figure with a long gloss in Italian. The first lines read, "Questo vuol tanto dire come il luogo, dov' è il creatore del tutto, o la prima causa. Chiamanlo per un' altro nome Hometeule." English translation: "This means the place where the creator of all things—or the First Cause—exists. They also name it Hometeule." A close comparison shows that this icon of "Hometeule" is nearly identical to Tonacateuctli (as one would expect). The "teule" part of the word is recognizable from many letters and manuscripts by conquistadors: it is how the Spaniards heard and wrote down the Nahuatl word "teotl," meaning supernatural entity or god. And, of course, the "h" is silent in Spanish. So "hometeule" is a Spanish-speaker's phonetic transcription of "Ometeotl."

As a result of these references, many scholars (most notably Miguel León-Portilla) interpret the rare name ōmeteōtl as "Dual God" or "Lord of the Duality". León-Portilla further argues that Ōmeteōtl was the supreme creator deity of the Aztecs, and that the Aztecs envisioned this deity as a mystical entity with a dual nature.

== Criticism ==
Other scholars however, notably Richard Haly (1992), argue that there was no Ōmeteōtl, Ometecuhtli or Omecihuatl among the Aztecs. Instead, he claims, the names should be interpreted using the Nahuatl root omi ("bone"), rather than ōme ("two"). Haly further contends that Omitecuhtli was another name for Tonacatecuhtli and Mictlantecuhtli, both gods related to the creation of humans from dead bones. He argues that, of the five sources used by León-Portilla to argue in favor of the existence of a single creator god among the Aztecs, none contains a clear reference to a god of duality.

First, León-Portilla cites the Franciscan Fray Juan de Torquemada, who affirms in his chronicle that the "Indians wanted the divine Nature shared by two gods". In his translation of the Cantares Mexicanos León-Portilla introduces a reference to the "God of duality" where it is not explicitly found in the original text, which reads "ōme ihcac yehhuān Dios". Haly argues that León-Portilla erroneously unites "stands dual" with the Spanish loanword Dios ("God") to invent this dual deity. Another example given by León-Portilla is from the Historia Tolteca-Chichimeca: "ay ōmeteōtl ya tēyōcoyani", literally "two-god, creator of humanity." Haly, reading the interjection ay as part of a longer (and similarly unattested) ayōmeteōtl, argues that this should rather be translated as "juicy maguey God" as the text talks about the imbibing of pulque. The Codex Ríos has a representation of a god labelled hometeule — iconographic analysis shows the deity Hometeule to be identical to Tonacatecuhtli. The fifth source is the History of the Mexicans as Told by Their Paintings which Haly shows does not in fact read ōmeteōtl, but rather "omiteuctli, ("bone-lord") who is also called Maquizcoatl" and is explicitly stated to be identical to Huitzilopochtli.

James Maffie in his book Aztec Philosophy poses the argument that Aztec religion was pantheistic, centered on the entity Teotl. As a result of the pantheism proposed by Maffie that he claims was practiced by the Aztecs, it is by definition not possible that Ometeotl can be a “God of Duality” that is separate from Teotl, which is contradictory to the way in which Leon-Portilla talks about Ometeotl as a transcendental creator god.
