= Pedro de los Ríos =

Domician missionary in New Spain (died 1563~1665)

Fray Pedro de los Ríos (died 1563–1565) was a Domician missionary in New Spain in the mid-16th century. Little is known about him, but he contributed to the creation of the manuscripts now known as the Codex Telleriano-Remensis and Codex Vaticanus A, which describe Aztec culture and history. The Codex Vaticanus A is also known as the Codex Ríos, after Pedro de los Ríos.

Jansen (1984) places Fray De los Rios as frater laicus (lay brother) assigned in 1559 to the convent of Santo Domingo in Puebla.

According to Jansen, De los Rios was present at the war of Coatlan in 1547. "This war took place in the month of April, the first day of Easter, the Zapotecas of Coatlan and Tetipa rose up. They came to peace on the 23rd day of July of this said year. It is clear, therefore, that this is about Coatlan in the Zapotec region, in the current State of Oaxaca. The war was an important indigenous resistance movement, based on prophecies about a rebirth of the pre-Hispanic order." (Jansen, 1984, p. 71).
