= Chalchiuhtlatonal =

Aztec god of water

In Aztec mythology, Chalchiuhtlatonal (/ˌtʃæltʃiˌuːtləˈtoʊnəl/) was a god of water, related to Chalchiuhtlicue. He looks over the sea, and protects the animals living in it. It is said that he granted the gift of water to one human in 10,000 years to help look after the sea.
