= Xiuhtotontli =

Group of gods from Aztec mythology

Xiuhtotontli is an Aztec group of gods that are forms of Xiuhtecuhtli.
