= Chalchiuhtlicue =

Aztec goddess of water, seas, oceans, rivers, lakes, streams, rain, storms, and baptism

- Goddess of Water, Seas, Oceans, Rivers, Lakes, Streams, and Baptism
- Member of Aztec gods
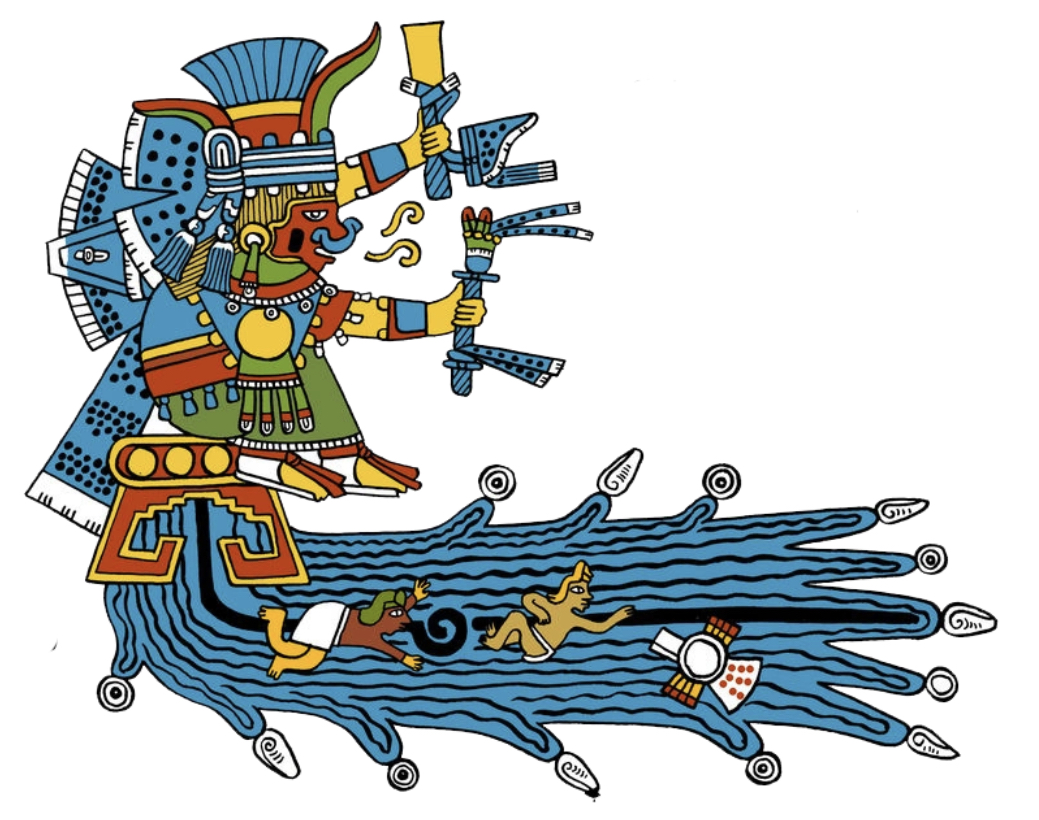
- Chalchiutlicue in the Codex Borbonicus (page 2)
- Other names: Iztac-Chalchiuhtlicue, Matlalcueye, Ayauhtéotl
- Abode: Tlālōcān; Thirteen Heavens (First Heaven); Gulf of Mexico
- Gender: Female
- Region: Mesoamerica
- Ethnic group: Aztecs, Tlaxcaltec (Nahuas)

Genealogy
- Parents: Created by the Tezcatlipocas (Codex Zumarraga)
- Siblings: None
- Consort: Tlaloc
- Children: With Tlaloc: the Tlaloque (Nappatecuhtli, Tomiyauhtecuhtli, Opochtli, Yauhtli) and Huixtocihuatl; With Tonatiuh: Centzon Mimixcoa (Leyenda de los Soles)

Equivalents
- Greek: Poseidon
- Mixe: Hɨgɨñ

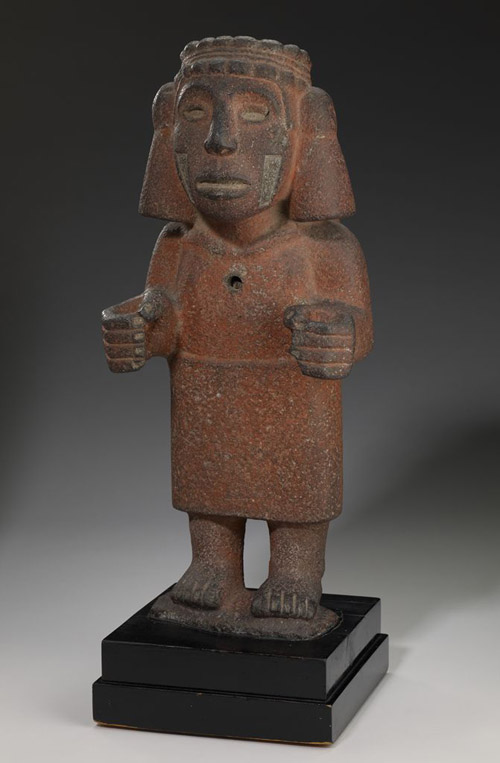
Chalchiuhtlicue, unknown Aztec artist, 1200–1521, gray basalt, red ochre. Minneapolis Institute of Arts, 2009.33

Chalchiuhtlicue [t͡ʃaːɬt͡ʃiwˈt͡ɬikʷeː] or 'She of the Jade Skirt' (from chālchihuitl [t͡ʃaːɬˈt͡ʃiwit͡ɬ] 'jade' and cuēitl [kʷeːit͡ɬ] 'skirt'; also spelled Chalciuhtlicue, Chalchiuhcueye, or Chalcihuitlicue) is an Aztec deity of water, rivers, seas, streams, and storms. Chalchiuhtlicue is associated with fertility, and she is the patroness of childbirth. Chalchiuhtlicue was highly revered at the time of the Spanish conquest of the Aztec Empire, and she was an important deity for the Nahuas in the Postclassic period of central Mexico. Chalchiuhtlicue belongs to a larger group of Aztec rain gods, and she is closely related to the water god Chalchiuhtlatonal.

== Religious significance ==
Chalchiuitlicue directly translates to 'Jade her skirt'; however, her name is most commonly interpreted as 'she of the jade skirt'. She was also known as Chalchiuhtlatonac (chalchihu[itl]-tla-tona-c) 'She who shines like jade' and Matlalcueye 'Possessor of the Blue Skirt' by the Tlaxcalans, an indigenous group who inhabited the republic of Tlaxcala.

Chalchiuitlicue was the wife or sister of the Aztec god of rain Tlaloc, depending on the text. Tlaloc and Chalchiuitlicue share similar attributes as they are both water deities; however, Chalchiuitlicue was often associated with groundwater, unlike Tlaloc. She was also the mother of the Aztec moon god Tecciztecatl. In other texts, she was the wife of Xiuhtecuhtli, who was a senior deity for the Aztecs.

In Aztec religion, Chalchiuitlicue helps Tlaloc to rule the paradisial kingdom of Tlalocan. Chalchiutlicue brings fertility to crops and is thought to protect women and children.

According to myths, Chalchiuhtlicue once ate the sun and the moon. She is often associated with serpents, as most Aztec water deities are. It is thought that her association with water and fertility speaks to the Aztecs' association with the womb and water. She often withheld a dual role in Aztec mythology as both a life-giver and life-ender. In the Aztec creation myth of the Five Suns, Chalchiuhtlicue presided over the Fourth Sun or the fourth creation of the world. It is believed that Chalchiuhtlicue retaliated against Tlaloc's mistreatment of her by releasing 52 years of rain, causing a giant flood which caused the Fourth Sun to be destroyed. She built a bridge linking heaven and earth and those who were in Chalchiuhtlicue's good graces were allowed to traverse it, while others were turned into fish. Following the flood, the Fifth Sun developed. The Fifth Sun is the world which we now occupy. During her reign the Aztecs first began to use maize, which became a paramount staple in their diet and economy.

Chalchiutlicue was associated with the many fasciates of water as well as being credited with being involved with the death of those who died in drowning accidents.

In addition to water-related deaths, Chalchiuhtlicue presided over birth rituals, bathing of sacrificial victims and ceremonial actors, judiciary purification, royal investiture, and the recycling of ritual waste.

Chalchiuhtlicue was often depicted as "a river, out of which grew a prickly pear cactus laden with fruit, which symbolized the human heart." (Schwartz 2018, 14). She was believed to be the personification of youth, beauty, and zeal, although she should not be confused with Tlazolteotl (also known as Ixucuina or Tlaelquani), who was the Aztec goddess of midwives, steam baths, purification, sin, and was the patroness of adulterers. Although the two goddesses often overlapped, they were distinct from one another.

== Archaeological records ==
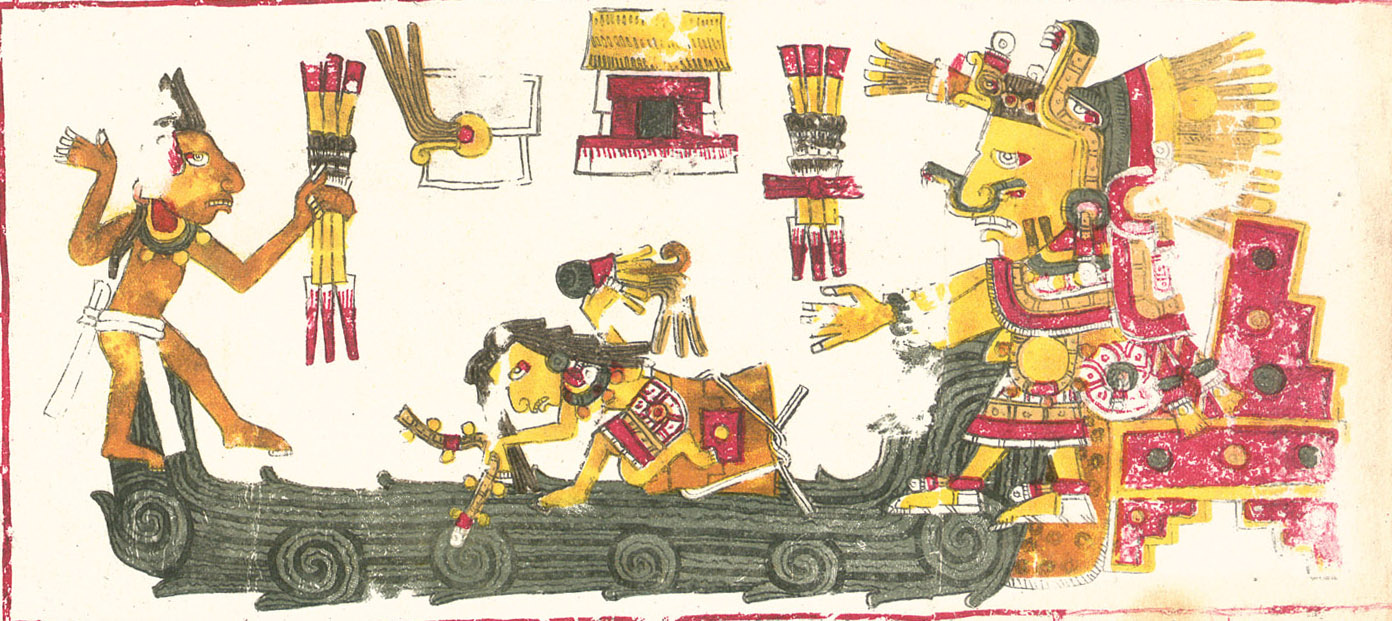
Chalchiuhtlicue in Codex Borgia, page 65. Chalchiuhtlicue pictured at right.

Chalchiutlicue is depicted in several central Mexican manuscripts, including the Pre-Columbian Codex Borgia (plates 11 and 65), the 16th century Codex Borbonicus (page 5), the 16th century Codex Ríos (page 17), and the Florentine Codex (plate 11). When represented through sculpture, Chalchiutlicue is often carved from green stone in accordance with her name.

The Pyramid of the Moon is a large pyramid located in Teotihuacán, the dominant political power in the central Mexican region during the Early Classic period (ca. 200–600 CE). The pyramid is thought to have been at one point dedicated to Chalchiutlicue. It accompanies The Pyramid of the Sun, which is thought to have been dedicated to Chalchiutlicue's husband Tlaloc.

In the mid-19th century, archaeologists unearthed a 20-ton monolithic sculpture depicting a water goddess that is believed to be Chalchiuhtlicue from underneath The Pyramid of the Moon. The sculpture was excavated from the plaza forecourt of the Pyramid of the Moon structure. The sculpture was relocated by Leopoldo Batres to Mexico City in 1889, where it is presently in the collection of the Museo Nacional de Antropología.

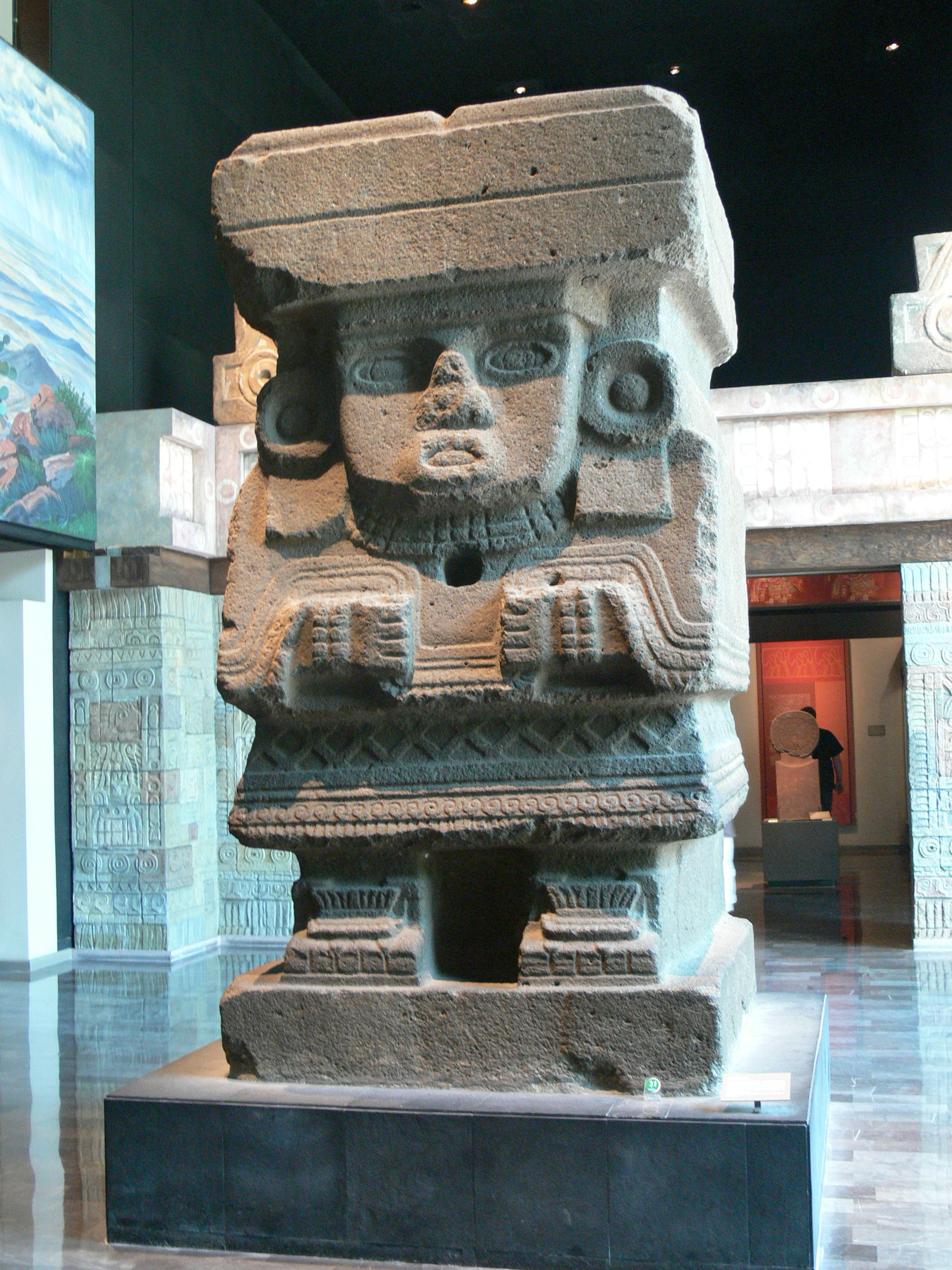
Statue of Chalchiuhtlicue (or other water goddess) from the Pyramid of the Moon

== Visual representations ==
Chalchihuitlicue wears a distinctive headdress, which consists of several broad, likely cotton bands trimmed with amaranth seeds. Large round tassels fall from either side of the headdress. Chalchihuitlicue typically wears a shawl adorned with tassels and a skirt. She is often depicted sitting with a stream of water flowing out of or from behind her skirt.

In the Codex Borbonicus (page 5), Chalchihuitlicue wears an elaborate blue and white headdress. She sits on a red stool and a stream of water flows out from the bottom of her stool. A male baby and female baby, who are depicted as if swimming, are carried in the water.

In the Codex Borgia (page 65), Chalchihuitlicue sits on a red throne and a river flows outwards from behind her body. Two figures stand in the water and Chalchihuitlicue gesticulates out towards them. She wears an elaborate yellow headdress.

== Rites and rituals ==
Five of the 20 big celebrations in the Aztec calendar were dedicated to Chalchiutlicue and her husband (or brother) Tlaloc. During these celebrations, priests dove into a lake and imitated the movements and the croaking of frogs, hoping to bring rain.

Chalchiutlicue presides over the day 5 Serpent and the trecena of 1 Reed. Her feast is celebrated in the ventena of Etzalqualiztli. She is associated with the fertility of both people and land, and the Aztecs asked Chalchiutlicue for a good harvest of crops.

A series of ritualistic ceremonies were performed and dedicated to Chalchiuhtlicue and other childbirth/water deities called Atlcahualo. These ceremonies would last the entire month of February.

=== Childbirth ===
Chalchiutlicue was the guardian of the children and newborns. When children fell ill, healers called on the goddess as they practiced hydromancy in order to find the tonalli (spirits) of sick children. She also played a central role in the process of childbirth. Mothers and babies often died in the process of childbirth; the role of the midwife was also of utmost importance in the process. During labor, the midwife spoke to the newborn and ask the gods that the baby's birth ensure a prime place among them. After cutting the umbilical cord, the midwife washed the new baby with customary greetings to Chalchiutlicue. Four days after the birth, the child was given a second bath and a name.

As reported by Sahagún's informants, the midwife said, "The gods Ometecutli and Omecioatl who realm in the ninth and tenth heavens, have begotten you in this light and brought you into this world full of calamity and pain take then this water, which will protect you life, in the name of the goddess Chalchiutlicue." She then sprinkled water at the head of the child and said, "Behold this element without whose assistance no mortal being can survive." She also sprinkled water on the breast of the baby while saying, "Receive this celestial water that washes impurity from your heart." She then went to the head and said, "Son, receive this divine water, which must be drunk that all may live that it may wash you and wash away all your misfortunes, part of the life since the beginning of the world: this water in truth has a unique power to oppose misfortune." Finally, the midwife washed the entire body of the baby and said, "In which part of you is unhappiness hidden? Or in which part are you hiding? Leave this child, today, he is born again in the healthful waters in which he has been bathed, as mandated by the will of the god of the sea Chalchiutlicue."

== See also ==
- List of water deities
- Creation myth
- Codex Borgia
- Chicomecoatl
- Aztec religion
