= Xiuhtecuhtli =

Aztec god of fire, heat, and time

- Father of the Gods; God of Fire, Heat and Time
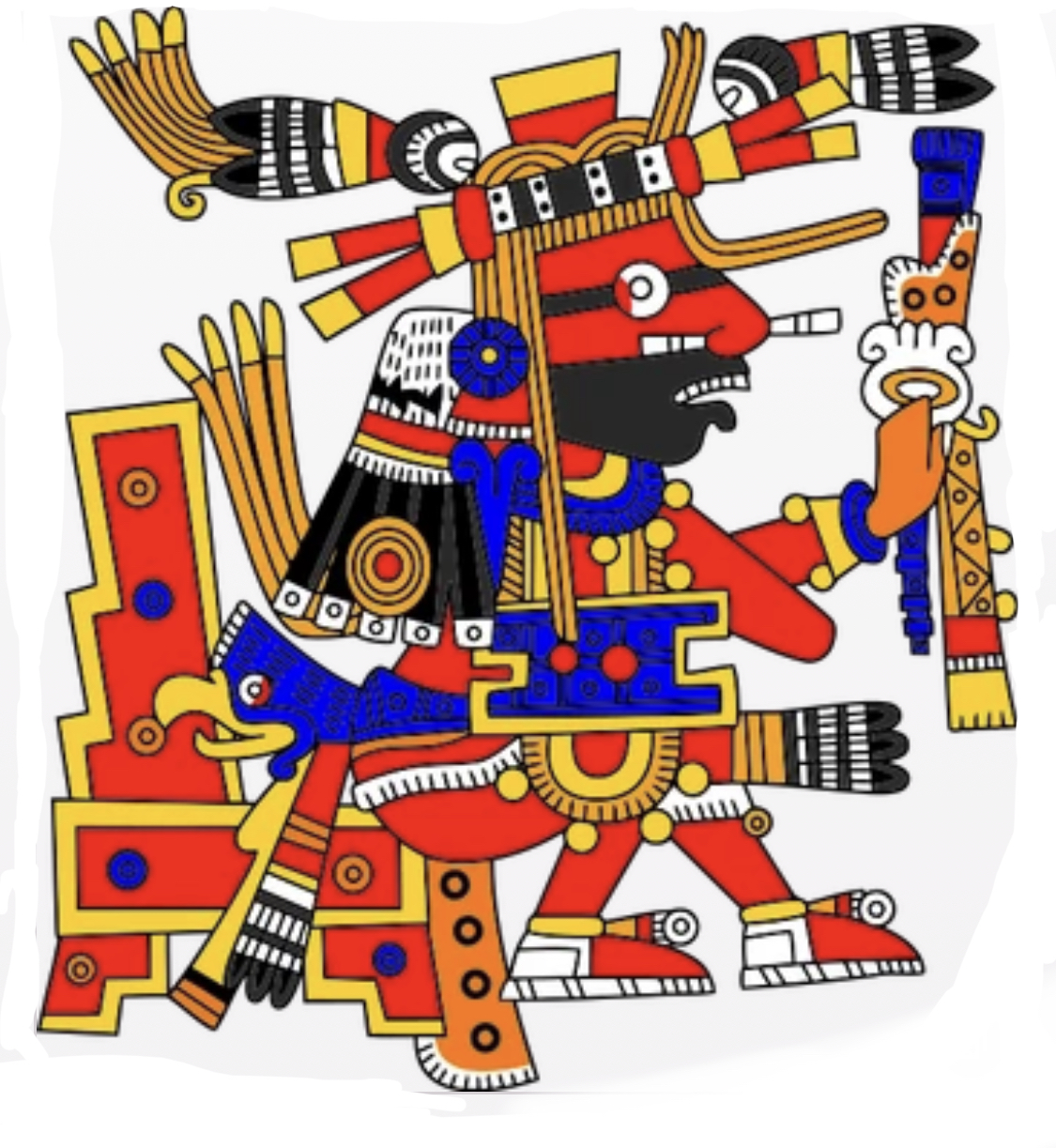
- Xiuhtēcuhtli as depicted in the Codex Borgia
- Other names: Totahtzin, Īxcōzauhqui, Huēhuehtēōtl, Cuezaltzin
- Abode: • Ilhuicatl-Teotlatlauhco (Eleventh Heaven) • Calpulli (the center of the four cardinal directions)
- Gender: Male
- Region: Mesoamerica
- Ethnic group: Aztec (Nahua)

Genealogy
- Parents: Created by the Tezcatlipocas (Codex Zumarraga)
- Siblings: None
- Consort: Chāntico (Codex Zumarraga)
- Children: With Chāntico: Xiuhxoxoauhqui (blue fire), Xiuhcozauhqui (yellow fire), Xiuhiztac (white fire) and Xiuhtlatlauhqui (red fire)

Equivalents
- Maya: K'awiil (God K)

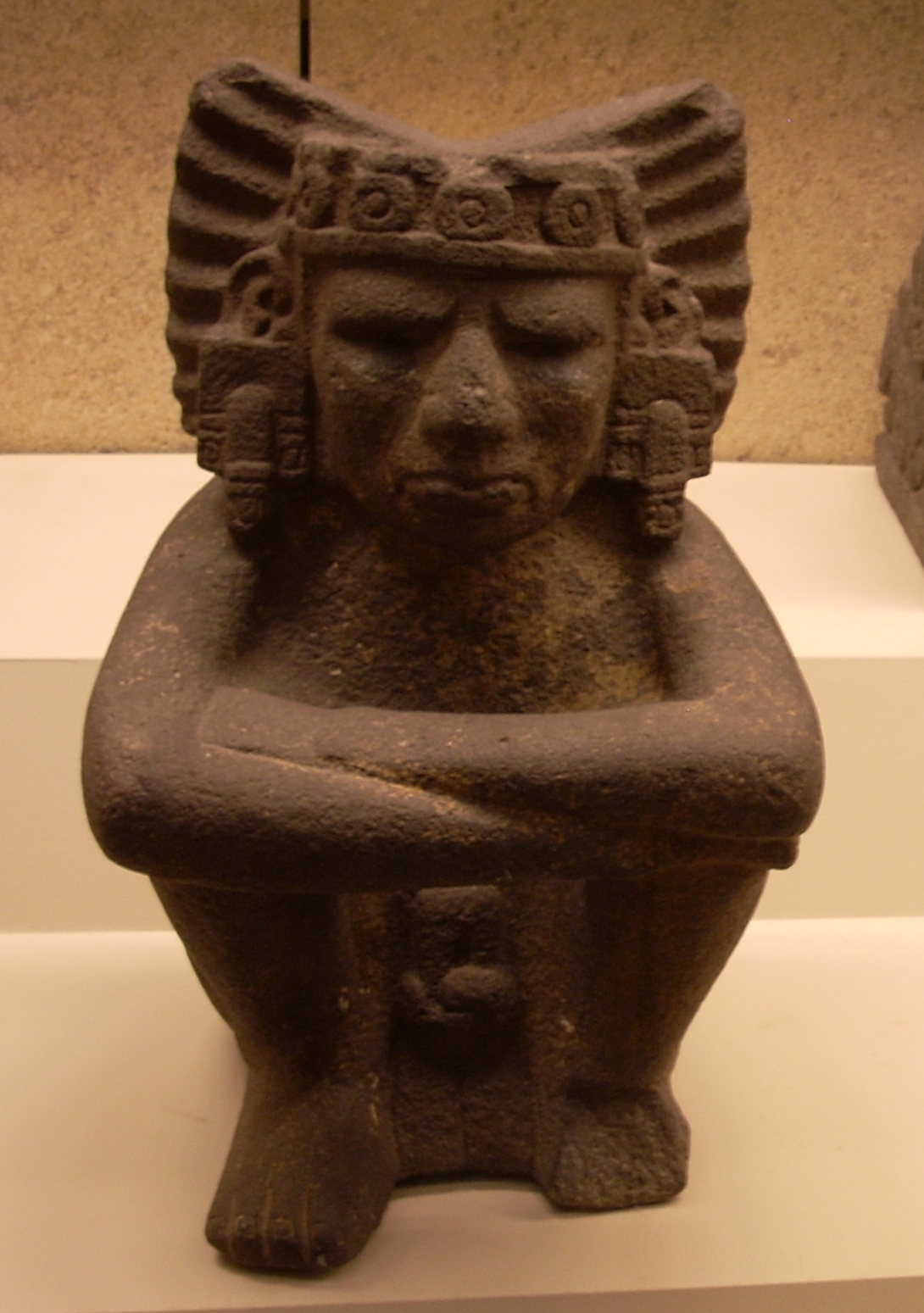
Statue of Xiuhtecuhtli in the British Museum

In Aztec mythology, Xiuhtēcuhtli [ʃiʍˈteːkʷt͡ɬi] ("Turquoise Lord" or "Lord of Fire") was the god of fire, day and heat. In historical sources he is called by many names, which reflect his varied aspects and dwellings in the three parts of the cosmos. He was the lord of volcanoes, the personification of life after death, warmth in cold (fire), light in darkness and food during famine. He was also named Cuezaltzin [kʷeˈs̻aɬt͡sin̥] ("flame") and Ixcozauhqui [iːʃkoːˈsaʍkiˀ], and is sometimes considered to be the same as Huehueteotl ("Old God"), although Xiuhtecuhtli is usually shown as a young deity. His wife was Chalchiuhtlicue. Xiuhtecuhtli is sometimes considered to be a manifestation of Ometecuhtli, the Lord of Duality, and according to the Florentine Codex Xiuhtecuhtli was considered to be the father of the Gods, who dwelled in the turquoise enclosure in the center of earth. Xiuhtecuhtli-Huehueteotl was one of the oldest and most revered of the indigenous pantheon. The cult of the God of Fire, of the Year, and of Turquoise perhaps began as far back as the middle Preclassic period. Turquoise was the symbolic equivalent of fire for Aztec priests. A small fire was permanently kept alive at the sacred center of every Aztec home in honor of Xiuhtecuhtli.

The Nahuatl word xihuitl means "year" as well as "turquoise" and "fire", and Xiuhtecuhtli was also the god of the year and of time. The Lord of the Year concept came from the Aztec belief that Xiuhtecuhtli was the North Star. In the 260-day ritual calendar, the deity was the patron of the day Atl ("Water") and with the trecena 1 Coatl ("1 Snake"). Xiuhtecuhtli was also one of the nine Lords of the Night and ruled the first hour of the night, named Cipactli ("Alligator"). Scholars have long emphasized that this fire deity also has aquatic qualities. Xiuhtecuhtli dwelt inside an enclosure of turquoise stones, fortifying himself with turquoise bird water. He is the god of fire in relation to the cardinal directions, just as the brazier for lighting fire is the center of the house or temple. Xiuhtecuhtli was the patron god of the Aztec emperors, who were regarded as his living embodiment at their enthronement. The deity was also one of the patron gods of the pochteca merchant class.

Stone sculptures of Xiuhtecuhtli were ritually buried as offerings, and various statuettes have been recovered during excavations at the Great Temple of Tenochtitlan with which he was closely associated. Statuettes of the deity from the temple depict a seated male with his arms crossed. A sacred fire was always kept burning in the temples of Xiuhtecuhtli. In gratitude for the gift of fire, the first mouthful of food from each meal was flung into the hearth.

Xiuhtecuhtli is depicted in the Codex Borgia.

== Attributes ==
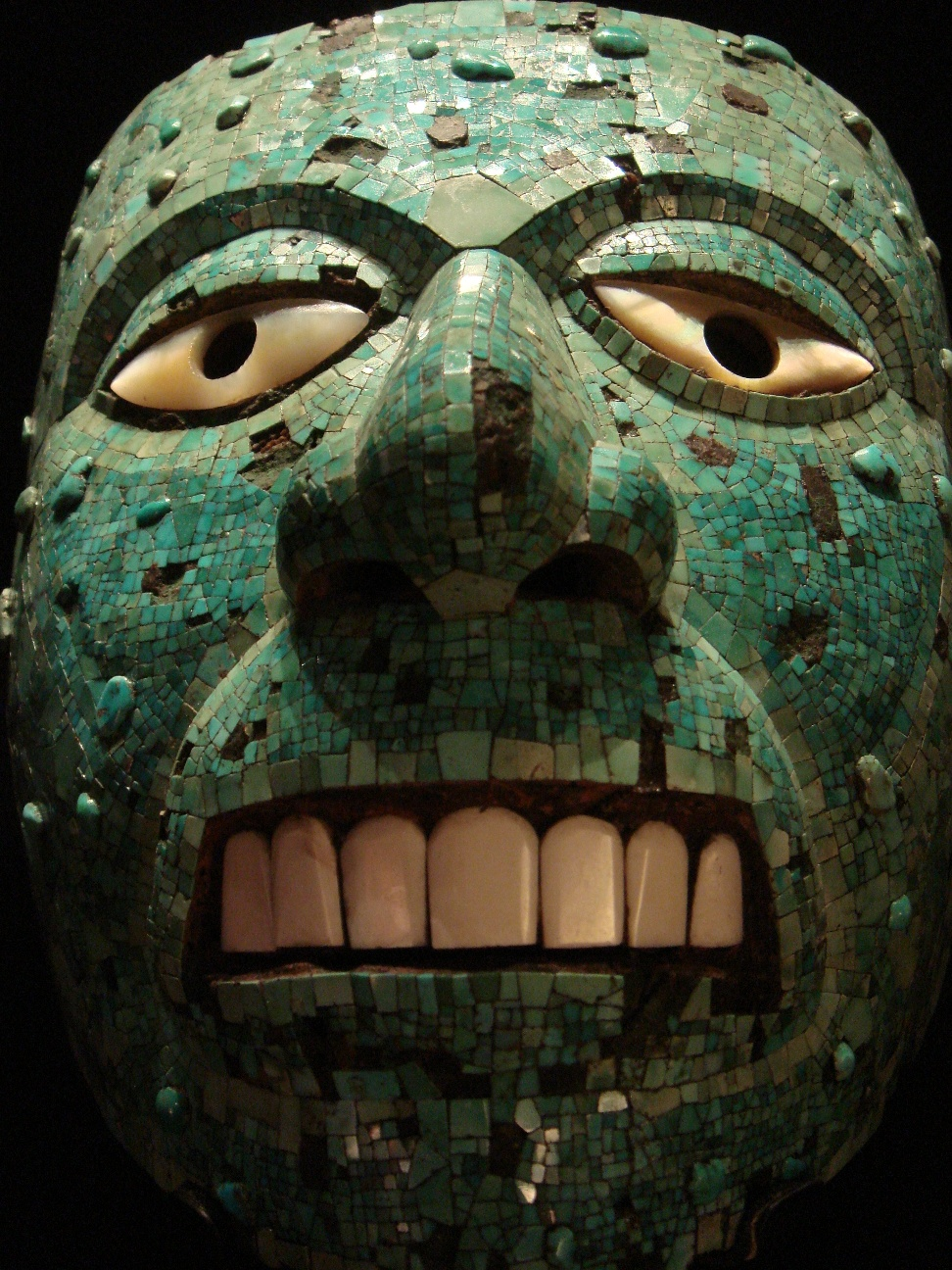
The mask of Xiuhtecuhtli, from the British Museum, of Aztec or Mixtec provenance

Xiuhtecuhtli's face is painted with black and red pigment. Xiuhtecuhtli was usually depicted adorned with turquoise mosaic, wearing the turquoise xiuhuitzolli crown of rulership on his head and a turquoise butterfly pectoral on his chest, and he often wears a descending turquoise xiuhtototl bird (Cotinga amabilis) on his forehead and the Xiuhcoatl fire serpent on his back. He owns fire serpent earplugs. On his head he has a paper crown painted with different colors and motifs. On top of the crown there are sprays of green feathers, like flames from a fire. He has feather tufts to each side, like pendants, toward his ears. On his back he has plumage resembling a dragon's head, made of yellow feathers with marine conch shells. He has copper bells tied to the insteps of his feet. In his left hand he holds a shield with five greenstones, called chalchihuites, placed in the form of a cross on a thin gold plate that covered almost all the shield. In his right hand he has a kind of scepter that was a round gold plate with a hole in the middle, and topped by two globes, one larger than the other, the smaller one had a point. Xiuhtecuhtli is closely associated with youthful warriors and with rulership, and was considered a solar god. His principal symbols are the tecpatl (flint) and the mamalhuatzin, the two sticks that were rubbed together to light ceremonial fires. A staff with a deer's head was also an attribute of Xiuhtecuhtli, although not exclusively so as it could also be associated with Xochiquetzal and other deities.

Many of the attributes of Xiuhtecuhtli are found associated with Early Postclassic Toltec warriors but clear representations of the god are not common until the Late Postclassic. The nahual, or spirit form, of Xiuhtecuhtli is Xiuhcoatl, the Fire Serpent.

Xiuhtecuhtli was embodied in the teotecuilli, the sacrificial brazier into which sacrificial victims were cast during the New Fire ceremony. This took place at the end of each cycle of the Aztec calendar round (every 52 years), when the gods were thought to be able to end their covenant with humanity. Feasts were held in honor of Xiuhtecuhtli to keep his favors, and human sacrifices were burned after removing their heart.

== Annual festival ==
The annual festival of Xiuhtecuhtli was celebrated in Izcalli, the 18th veintena of the year. The Nahuatl word izcalli means "stone house" and refers to the building where maize used to be dried and roasted between mid-January and mid-February. The whole month was therefore devoted to fire. The Izcalli rituals grew in importance every four years. A framework image of the deity was constructed from wood and was richly finished with clothing, feathers and an elaborate mask. Quails were sacrificed to the idol and their blood spilt before it and copal was burnt in his honour. On the day of the festival, the priests of Xiuhtecuhtli spent the day dancing and singing before their god. People caught animals, including mammals, birds, snakes, lizards and fish, for ten days before the festival in order to throw them into the hearth on the night of the festival. On the tenth day of Izcalli, during a festival called huauhquiltamalcualiztli ("eating of the amaranth leaf tamales"), the New Fire was lighted, signifying the change of the annual cycle and the rebirth of the fire deity. During the night the image of the god was lit with using the mamalhuatzin. Food was consumed ritually, including shrimp tamales, after first offering it to the god.

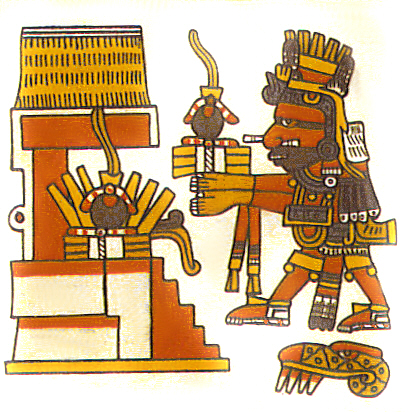
Xiuhtecuhtli in his role as one of the lords of the night, from the Codex Borgia

Every four years a more solemn version of the festival was held at the temple of Xiuhtecuhtli in Tenochtitlan, attended by the emperor and his nobles. Slaves and captives were dressed as the deity and sacrificed in his honour. Godparents were assigned to children on this day and the children had their ears ritually pierced. After this, the children, their parents and godparents all shared a meal together.

== New Fire Ceremony ==
Xiuhtecuhtli was celebrated often but especially at the end of every 52-year period. This was the time the 365-day solar and the 260-day sacred calendars ended on the same day and the Aztec celebrated the Binding of the Years with the New Fire Ceremony. In order to perform the ritual, priests marched in solemn procession up the Hill of the Star on a peninsula near Culhuacán to wait for the star Yohualtecuhtli (either Aldebaran in the Taurus constellation or the Pleiades as a whole) to get past its zenith. Having ascertained this, they would tear out the heart of a sacrificial victim and kindle a flame in a small wooden hearth they placed inside the hole left in his chest. Priests used a drill method to generate this sacred flame. It was then carried on pine sticks to light the fires anew in every hearth, including the sacred braziers of perpetual fire, that numbered over 600 in the capital alone.

== In popular culture ==
A set of six postage stamps issued by the Royal Mail in 2003 to commemorate the 250th anniversary of the British Museum featured a mask of Xiuhtecuhtli alongside other Museum objects such as the Sutton Hoo helmet and Hoa Hakananai'a.

== See also ==
- Xiuhcoatl
- Lords of the Night (mythology)
- Nagual
- Serpent symbolism
