= Codex Fejérváry-Mayer =

Aztec Codex of central Mexico

First page of the Codex Fejérváry-Mayer

The Codex Fejérváry-Mayer is an Aztec Codex of central Mexico. It is one of the rare Native American manuscripts that have survived the Spanish conquest of the Aztec Empire. As a typical calendar codex tonalamatl dealing with the sacred Aztec calendar – the tonalpohualli – it is placed in the Borgia Group. It is a divinatory almanac in 17 sections. Its elaboration is typically pre-Columbian: it is made on deerskin parchment folded accordion-style into 23 pages. It measures 16.2 centimetres by 17.2 centimetres and is 3.85 metres long.

== History ==
The earliest history of the codex is unknown. It is named after Gabriel Fejérváry (1780–1851), a Hungarian collector, and Joseph Mayer (1803–1886), an English antiquarian who bought the codex from Fejérváry. In 2004, Maarten Jansen and Gabina Aurora Pérez Jiménez proposed that it be given the indigenous name Codex Tezcatlipoca, from the Nahuatl name of the god Tezcatlipoca (who is shown, with black-and-yellow facial striping, in the centre of its first page), although it is not certain that its creators were Nahuas.

It is currently kept in the World Museum Liverpool in Liverpool, England, having as its catalogue # 12014 M. It is published in Volume 26 of the series Codices Selecti of the Akademische Druck - u. Verlagsanstalt - Graz. It is believed to have originated specifically in Veracruz.

== Gallery ==
Plate 4 of the Mesoamerican Codex Fejérváry-Mayer

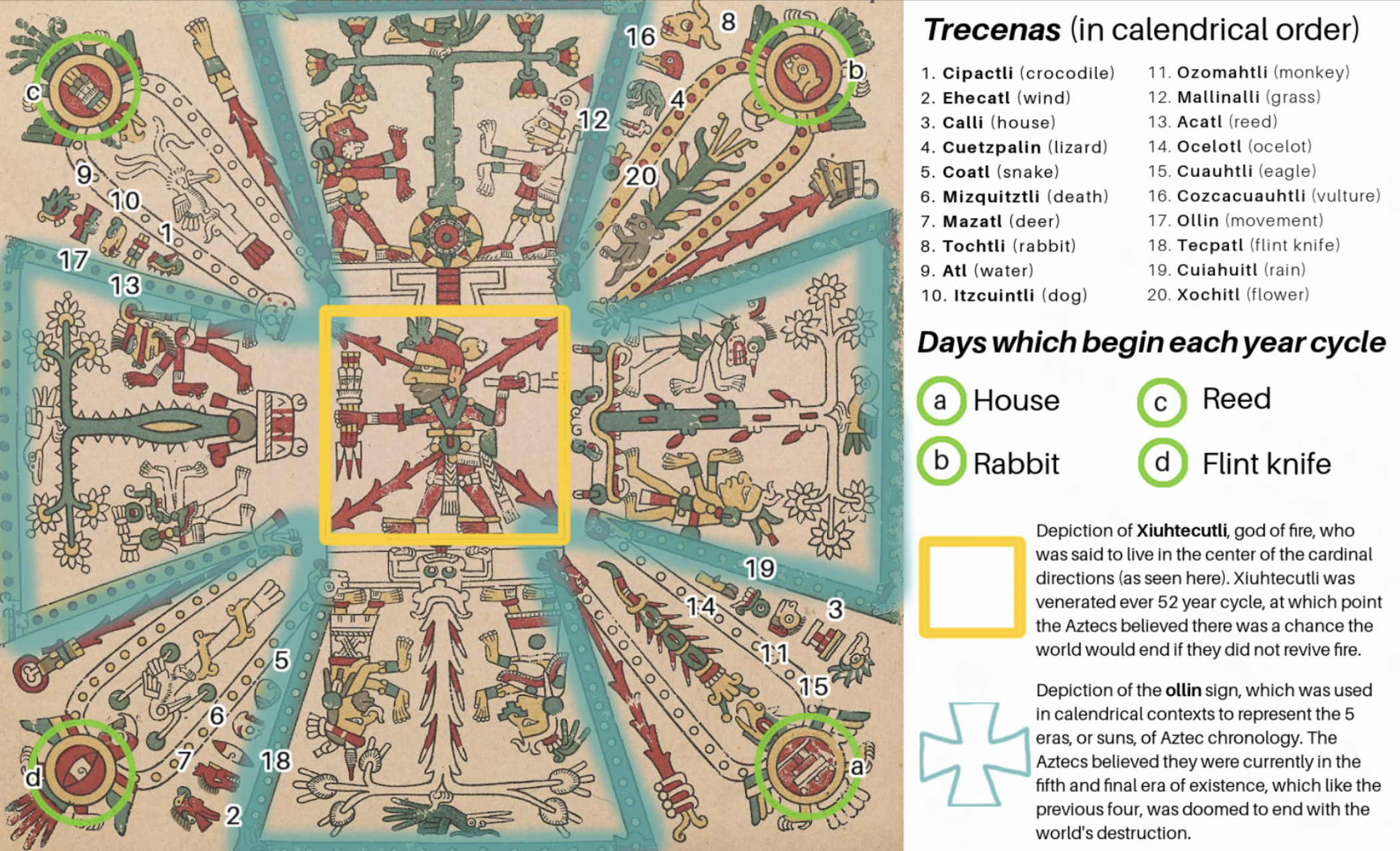
Annotated depiction of frontispiece showcasing calendrical symbols, specifically the trecenas of the tonalpohualli.

== See also ==
- Aztec codices
- Borgia Group
