= Mictēcacihuātl =

Aztec deity

Mictecacihuatl
- Goddess of the underworld
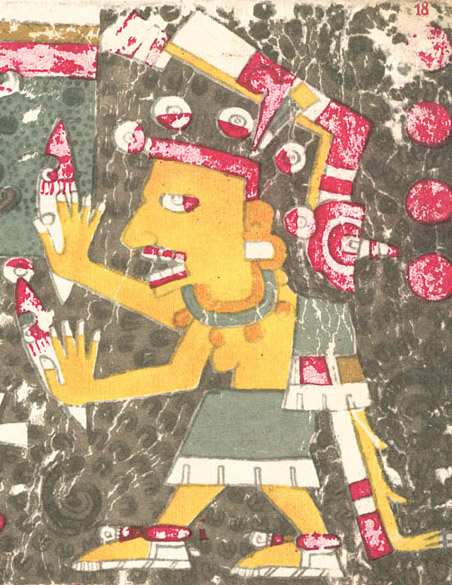
- Mictēcacihuātl as depicted in the Codex Borgia
- Venerated in: Aztec religion
- Abode: Mictlān
- Gender: Female
- Region: Central Mexico

In Aztec mythology, Mictēcacihuātl (Nahuatl pronunciation: [mik.teː.kaˈsi.waːt͡ɬ], meaning "Lady of the Dead", Otomi: Nohmüdü) is a female death deity and consort of Mictlāntēcutli, god of the dead and ruler of Mictlān, the lowest level of the underworld.

She is known as the "Lady of the Dead", since it is believed that she was born, then sacrificed as an infant. Mictēcacihuātl was represented with a flayed body and with jaw agape to swallow the stars during the day.

== See also ==
- Aztecs
- Aztec mythology
- Central America
- Latin America
- Mexico
- Pre-Columbian America
- Santa Muerte
