= History of the Mexicans as Told by Their Paintings =

The History of the Mexicans as Told by Their Paintings (Spanish: Historia de los Mexicanos por sus pinturas) is a sixteenth-century, Spanish-language, post-conquest account of Colhua Mexica religion and history. Scholarship has linked the text to work commissioned from Father Andrés de Olmos, an early Franciscan friar, and treats it as at least partly related to Indigenous pictorial sources.

Henry Phillips Jr., a 19th-century historian, made a translation of the document in the 1880s and referred to it as the Codex Ramírez, after Bishop Ramírez de Fuenleal who commissioned Olmos's work with Martín de Valencia in 1533.

The surviving Spanish text is preserved at the University of Texas at Austin.

== Text and publication history ==
Ramírez de Fuenleal and Martín de Valencia commissioned Olmos in 1533 to write on Indigenous antiquities; one study links the Historia to that project and suggests that the text was extracted from it around 1544. The extant copy forms part of the Libro de oro y tesoro índico, held in the university's Latin American Collection.

Joaquín García Icazbalceta published the Spanish text in Anales del Instituto Nacional de Antropología e Historia in 1882. Phillips translated the work into English and read his translation before the American Philosophical Society on October 19, 1883; it was later printed in the society's proceedings.

== See also ==
- Aztec codices
