= Codex Ríos =

Spanish colonial-era manuscript

- Vatican Library
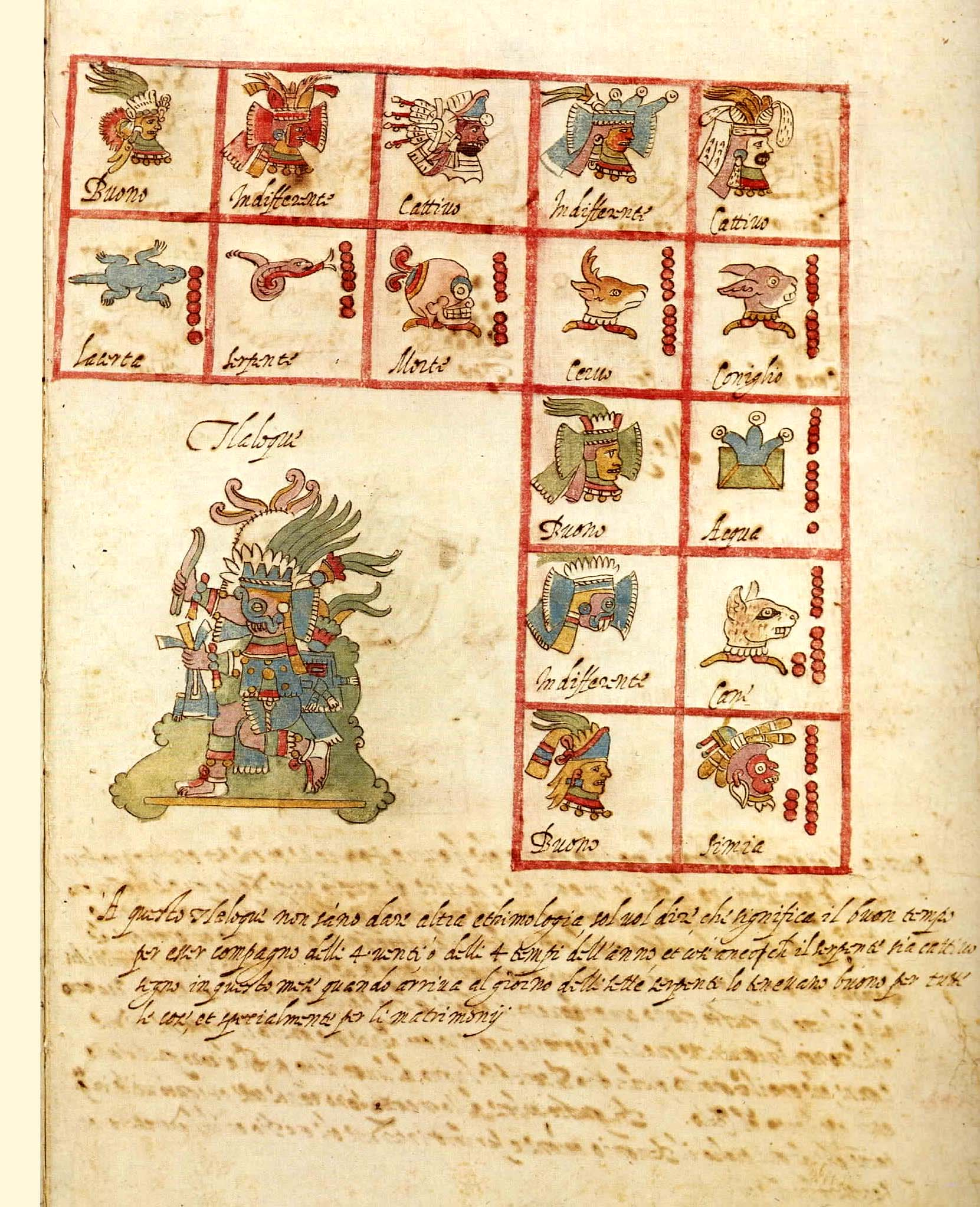
- Folio 20r, (Note: In manuscript terminology, recto refers to the front side of a folio (the right-hand page when a book is open), and verso to the back side (the left-hand page). Folios are typically cited using the folio number followed by r (recto) or v (verso), e.g., 7r, 11v. For further details, see Recto and verso.) which depicts the deity Tláloc (central left) surrounded by calendrical symbols
- Also known as: Indorum cultus, idolatria, et mores (transl. Worship, Idolatry, and Customs of the Indians); Codex Vaticanus A; Codex Vaticanus 3738; Copia vaticana
- Date: 16th century
- Language: Italian
- Material: European paper
- Size: 46 cm × 29 cm (18 in × 11 in)
- Format: Folio
- Contents: Aztec calendar; Aztec religion; chronicles; cosmology; divinatory almanac (tōnalpōhualli); ethnography

Codex Ríos, originally titled Indorum cultus, idolatria, et mores (Note: Latin for 'Worship, Idolatry, and Customs of the Indians') and also known as Codex Vaticanus A, is a 16th-century Italian translation and expansion of an earlier Aztec codex, the identity of which is debated. The source manuscript may have been the Codex Telleriano-Remensis or a hypothetical lost text known as Codex Huitzilopochtli, or the Codex Ríos may have drawn on multiple antecedents.

The Codex Ríos is organised into seven sections by subject, encompassing Aztec religion, cosmology, ethnography, a divinatory almanac, and pictorial chronicles. The annotations, written in cursive Italian, are attributed to Pedro de los Ríos, a Dominican friar working in New Spain between 1547 and 1562. Its illustrations were likely executed by an Italian artist in Rome before the codex entered the Vatican Library, where it remains.

== Contents ==
The Codex Ríos is written on European paper and comprises 101 folios, approximately 46 by 29 centimetres (18 in × 11 in) in size. It is divided into seven sections, organised by subject, with each section separated by one or more blank folios.

The first section addresses cosmological and religious traditions, including depictions of the heavens, pre-Hispanic giants known as tzocuillixeque, and the previous four eras or cosmogonic suns (1v–7r), as well as narratives concerning Aztec deities such as Quetzalcōātl (7v–11v). The second is the tōnalpōhualli, a 260-day divinatory almanac that portrays ornately dressed deities and other supernatural entities thought to influence the fate linked to each day (12v–33r). The third section presents the Aztec calendar tables covering the years 1558 to 1619, without any pictorial content (34v–36r). The fourth is an 18-month festival calendar, accompanied by illustrations of deities and nēmontēmi symbols associated with each period (42v–51r). The fifth is a primarily ethnographic section, describing sacrificial and funerary practices (54v–57r), and concludes with portraits of Indigenous individuals (57v–61r). The sixth section comprises pictorial chronicles spanning the years 1195 to 1549, beginning with the migration from Chicomoztoc—the mythical place of origin of the Nahuatl-speaking peoples—and continuing with events in the Valley of Mexico. It includes representations of rulers, military campaigns, celestial phenomena, and other historical events (66v–94r). The seventh and final section consists of year glyphs—the visual symbols used in the Aztec calendar system to designate specific years—for the period 1562 to 1566, without accompanying text or imagery (95r–96v).

== Source and authorship ==
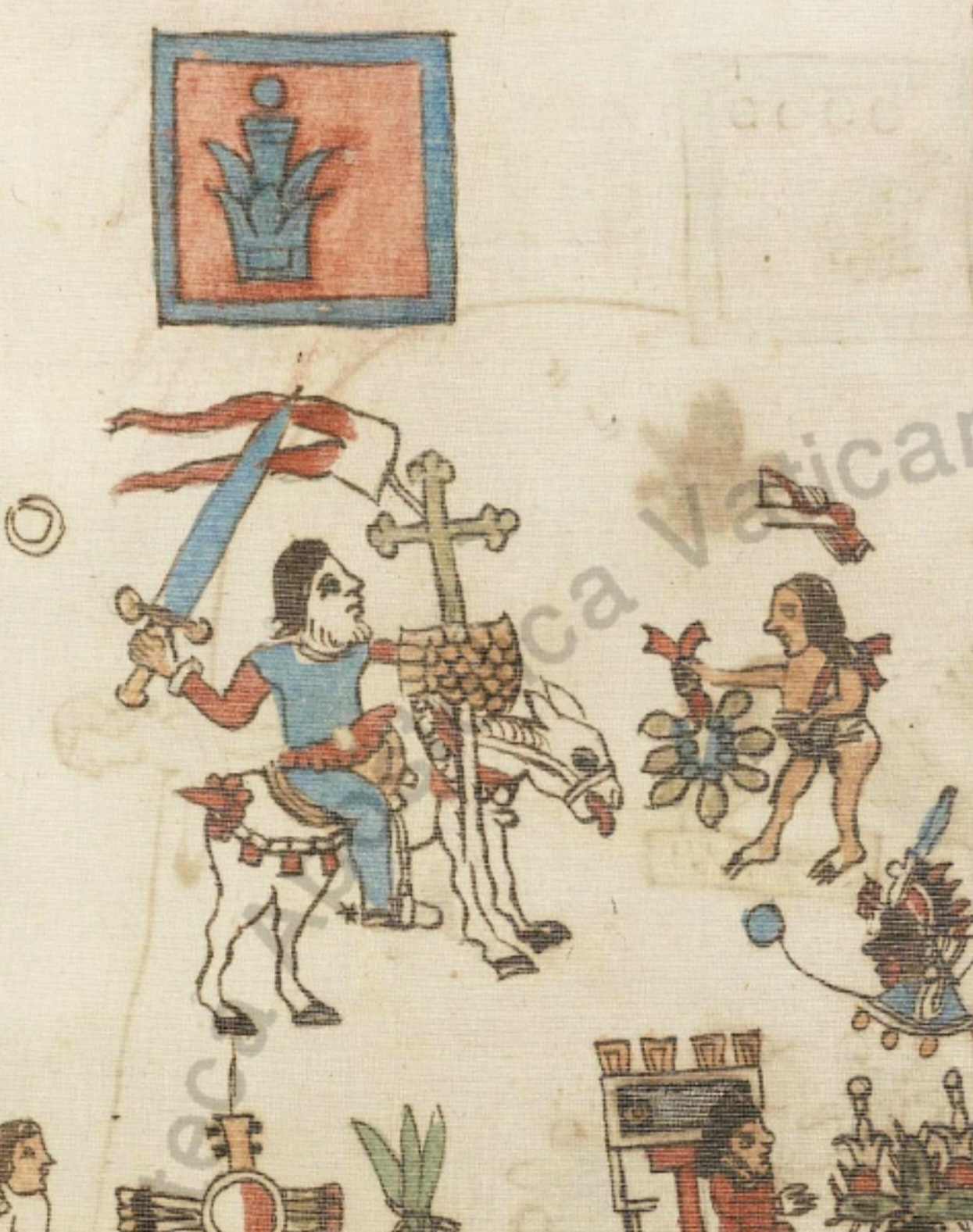
Cropped image from the Codex Ríos (f. 87r), depicting a scene from the early years of the Spanish conquest of the Aztec Empire

The exact date of the Codex Ríos's production is unclear. It is one of the two Aztec pictorial manuscripts known to have been held in the Vatican Library in the 16th century. (Note: The identity of the other manuscript remains unknown.) Produced in Rome by a presumably Italian artist, the codex was based on an earlier Aztec source text, the identity of which remains uncertain. One hypothesis holds that the Codex Telleriano-Remensis served as its model; however, the pages relating to the early years of the Spanish conquest of the Aztec Empire are missing from the Telleriano-Remensis, whereas the Ríos preserves material covering that period. A view common in the 19th century held that the Ríos had been copied from the Telleriano-Remensis before those pages were lost. The opposite scenario—that the Telleriano-Remensis was copied from the Ríos—is implausible, as the former appears to be the work of multiple Indigenous artists, whereas the latter displays the uniform style of a single individual.

The cursive Italian annotations in the Codex Ríos are attributed to Pedro de los Ríos, a Dominican friar active in New Spain between 1547 and 1562. He is known to have been present in Oaxaca during the Zapotec uprising of 1547, a millenarian rebellion influenced by Indigenous prophecies. Maarten Jansen, a Dutch scholar of Mesoamerican history, speculated that the Codex Ríos had been copied from the Codex Telleriano-Remensis shortly before Ríos's death in 1565 and entered the Vatican Library before 1600, where it is still preserved.

An alternative theory proposes that both manuscripts derived from a now-lost Aztec codex. R. H. Barlow, an American scholar of Mesoamerican cultures, coined the name Codex Huitzilopochtli for this hypothetical source, referencing Huītzilōpōchtli, the solar deity who appears at the beginning of the migration narratives in both Codex Ríos and Codex Telleriano-Remensis. Although both codices document the Aztec calendar, Codex Ríos includes a broader range of religious content, whilst Codex Telleriano-Remensis is characterised by its unique treatment of the calendrical systems and historical material. According to Juan José Batalla Rosado, a professor at the Complutense University of Madrid, this indicates that at least some parts of the two manuscripts may have been derived from distinct sources.

== See also ==
- Codex Vaticanus B – Another pre-Columbian Middle American pictorial manuscript housed at the Vatican Library
- Mesoamerican codices
