= Chantico =

Deity in Aztec religion

- Aztec goddess of the heart, the fires of the hearth, volcanoes, and the fires of the stove
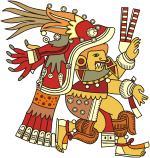
- Chantico in Codex Ríos
- Other names: Xantico
- Gender: female
- Region: Mesoamerica
- Ethnic group: Aztec (Nahua)
- Consort: Xiuhtecuhtli
- Offspring: With Xiuhtēcuhtli: Xiuhxoxoauhqui (blue fire), Xiuhcozauhqui (yellow fire), Xiuhiztac (white fire) and Xiuhtlatlauhqui (red fire)

In Aztec religion, Chantico ("she who dwells in the house") is the deity reigning over the fires in the family hearth. She broke a fast by eating paprika with roasted fish, and was turned into a dog by Tonacatecuhtli as punishment. She was associated with the town of Xochimilco, stonecutters, as well as warriorship. Chantico was described in various Pre-Columbian and colonial codices.

== Naming variations ==
Texts from the informants of Bernardino de Sahagún affirm Chantico's name to mean "she who dwells in the house" or "she who comes to make the house." Chantico is also said to also have been called Quaxolotl ("Two Headed"), since the male Aztec deity reigning over fire is named Xolotl. Chantico was also nicknamed Chiconaui Alternate spellings of Chantico include Cantico. Chantico was also known by her calendric name, Chicunaui itzcuintli (Nine Dog). According to interpreter Pedro de Rios, Chantico was also known as "Lady of the Capsicum-Pepper" and "yellow woman." Chantico was known to stonecutters as Papaloxaual (Butterfly Painting) and Tlappapalo ("she of the red butterfly")

== Origin narrative ==
According to the Codex Vaticanus A, also known as Codex Rios, Tonacatecuhtli turned her into a dog when she broke fast during a religious celebration by eating roasted fish and paprika, leading her to gain the name "Nine Dogs." Those born on the ninth day of eighteenth trecena, over which Chantico presided, would encounter misfortune since that day was associated with sorcerers, said to shape-shift into a number of animals.

== History ==
Scholar Eduard Seler conclude that at the time of Sahagún's writings, Chantico was primarily with the town of Xochimilco. largely due to a large population of stonecutters, known as tlatecque, residing there. He based his conclusion off of Sahagún's decision to mention Chantico's calendric name when listing deities that were particularly important to the tlatecque.

According to texts from the informants of Bernardino de Sahagún, Chantico was worshipped in a temple known as a tetlanman, in which priests prepared "red and black pigments, sandals, a robe, and small marine snails" for Chantico's feast. Chantico was also worshipped in the twenty ninth building of Templo Mayor according to Sahagún. According to Fray Juan de Torquemada, Chantico was also worshipped in a temple constructed by Moquihuix, ruler of Tlatelolco, in an attempt to conquer Tenochtitlan.

During the Aztec empire, Chantico held strong associations to military forces. According to inquisitorial records, Moctezuma reportedly used an idol effigy of Chantico that had a removable leg with which one would pound the earth in order to curse Hernán Cortés's advances into the Aztec Empire.

== Iconography ==
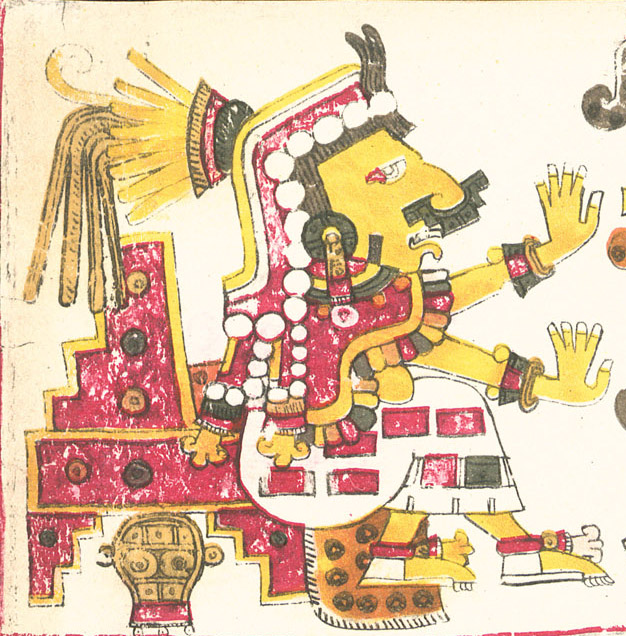
Chantico in Codex Borgia

In Codex Borgia, Chantico is depicted as having a yellow face marked with two red lines, which designate her as a fire goddess, and a yellow body. Said red lines are placed at around the same height as black strokes seen in depiction of Xolotl. She is referred to as "mujer amarilla" ("yellow woman"). She is depicted sitting on a chair, under which a flask lies, and wearing a nose ornament known as a yacapapalotl. She is also depicted with a series of small disks that wrap around her head.

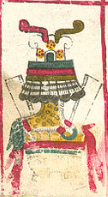
Chantico depicted as an eagle foot in the Codex Borgia

Sahagún and his informants describe Chantico by stating

"She has a bulge of rubber on her lips, half of her face painted red, a bouquet made of dried herbs, her gold ear decorations. On her back she carries a bundle of light. Her shirt with water flowers. Her shield with mosaic of eagle feathers, She has her clothes in one hand that ends in a tip, made of inverted feathers and with paint of obsidian tips. Her white kilt, her bells, her white sandals"

-Bernardino de Sahagun, "Ritos, sacerdotes, y atavíos de los dioses"

Chantico is commonly depicted with markers that illustrate her association to warriorship. Chantico's headdress in the Codex Rios displays military attributes: a crown of poisonous cactus spikes, related to danger and aggression; a crest of aztaxelli, green warrior's feathers, connecting her with warfare. At the nape of her neck is a band that forms the alt-tlachinolli, or water-fire, a symbol for warfare and pestilence. The atl-tlachinolli serves as an iconographic marker of Chantico, being seen in the Codex Aubin Tonalamatl, Codex Borbonicus, Codex Telleriano Remensis, and the Codex Rios. It is depicted as a stream of blue water intertwined with red fire. The Codex Borgia depicts Chantico through an eagle foot covered in jaguar skin, a symbol of Chantico, sitting on top of a sacrificial blood-dish, alluding to warrior sacrifice. The Codex Borbonicus shows Chantico wearing a blue nose ornament known as a yacaxihuitl also worn by Xolotl

Other iconographic markers associated with Chantico includes itzcactli ("obsidian sandals"), seen in the Codex Aubin Tonalamatl's representation of Chantico, and representations of a solar picture, seen in a golden pendant seen in the Codex Telleriano Remensis's depiction of Chantico.

== Debates ==
=== Gender ===
Although most commonly referred to as a female deity, the gender of Chantico remains unclear in certain historical writings. For example, the Codex Rios presents ambiguous pronouns, stating

Cantico they say was the first who offered sacrifice after having eaten a fried fish; and that in consequence of the presumption of offering sacrifice without having fasted, Tonacatecuhtli became incensed, and pronounced a curse against him (her), that he (she) should be changed into a dog, which is an animal of a very voracious nature; and accordingly they named him (her) Nine Dogs. He (she) presided over these thirteen signs. They said that he who was born on the first sign of Air (Wind) would be healthy by his nativity; but that if he grew ill of pains or cancer, that his disease would be incurable. He who was born on the ninth sign they believed would be unfortunate, because that sign was dedicated to sorcerers and necromancers, who transformed themselves into the shapes of various animals -Codex Rios

The Kingsborough commentary on the Codex Telleriano-Remensis also utilizes male pronouns, referring to Chantico as "the lord of chile" or "the yellow woman." However, in depictions of Chantico in Sahagún's manuscripts, Chantico is depicted with an upper-body garment and white skirt typically worn by women.

=== Mention in Duran's writings ===
Diego Durán makes no reference to the deity Chantico by name, but does reference a female deity Ciuacouatl which he associates with Xochimilco. Eduard Seler, a German anthropologist known for his extensive study of Mesoamerican cultures, notes in his commentary on the Codex Vaticanus B that he believes that Duran confused the Aztec deity Ciuacouatl with Chantico due to the proximity of the cities with which they are respectively associated with. However, H.B. Nicholson, scholar of Aztec civilization, regards such a viewpoint as "dubious."

=== Representation in the Templo Mayor ===
Upon encountering the colossal head found in the Templo Mayor, known as the Coyolxauhqui-Chantico monument, Mesoamerican scholar Hermann Mayer gave it is current name. Eduard Seler recognized that iconographic elements associated with Chantico, such as itzcactli ("obsidian sandals") and a golden pendant related to a solar picture, were present in the Coyolxauhqui-Chantico monument. Despite such associations, no colonial sources explicitly link Chantico to the Aztec deity Coyolxauhqui. Scholar H.B. Nicholson argues that Chantico is a manifestation of Coyolxauhqui and therefore, the name given to the monument is valid.

== Gallery ==
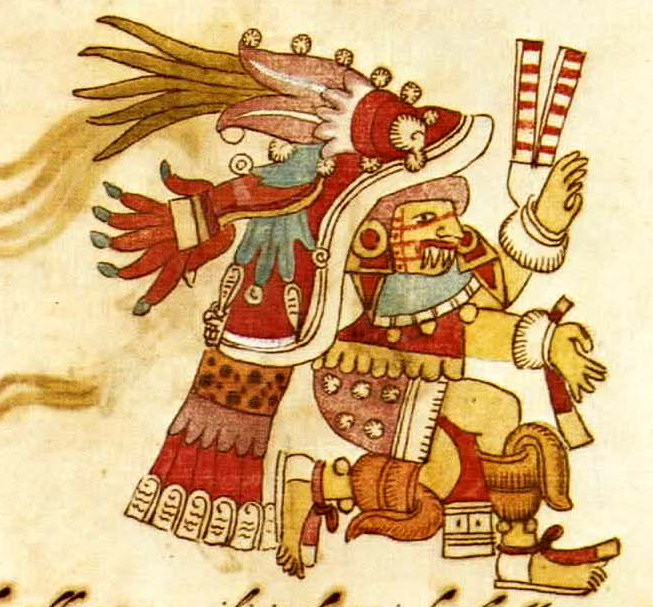
Chantico in Codex Ríos

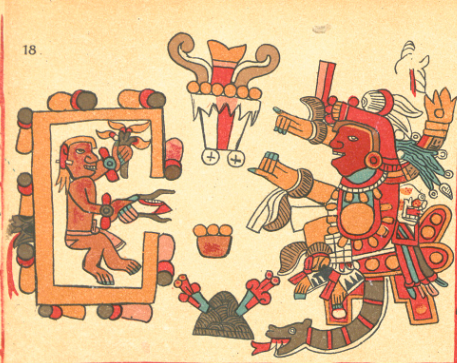
Chantico (right) depicted in Nahuatl codex Aubin Tonalamatl

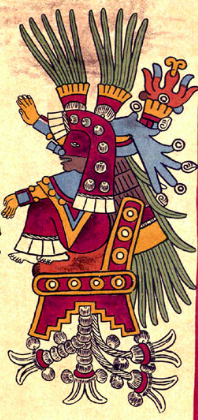
Chantico as depicted in Codex Borbonicus

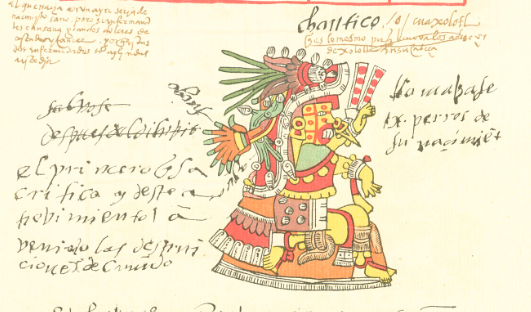
Chantico represented in Codex Telleriano Remensis

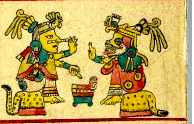
Chantico (left) as depicted in Codex Fejevary-Mayer

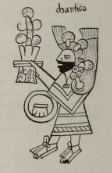
Chantico as depicted in Sahagún's Ritos, Sacerdotes, y atavíos de los dioses
