= Itztapaltotec =

Aztec Deity

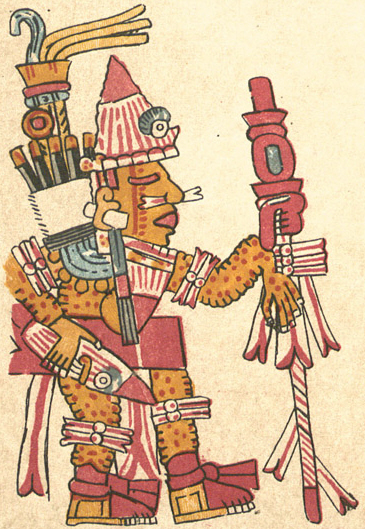
- Itztapaltotec, as depicted in the Codex Vaticanus B.
- Gender: male

In Aztec religion, Itztapaltotec (Nahuatl pronunciation: [it͡stapaltotek]), sometimes spelled Iztapaltotec, is an aspect of the fertility god Xipe Totec. In the Aztec calendar, he is one of the patrons of the trecena beginning with the day One Rabbit (ce tochtli in Nahuatl), alongside Xiuhtecuhtli, the god of fire. Xipe Totec proper is the patron of the trecena beginning with the day One Dog (ce itzcuintli). Itztapaltotec is an obscure figure, known only from tonalamatl (calendars). Brief, confusing information about him is given in two related manuscripts, the Codex Telleriano-Remensis and the Codex Ríos (or Codex Vaticanus A).

Itztapaltotec is probably related to Itztli, another figure of the Aztec calendar also depicted as a personified knife.

== Gallery ==
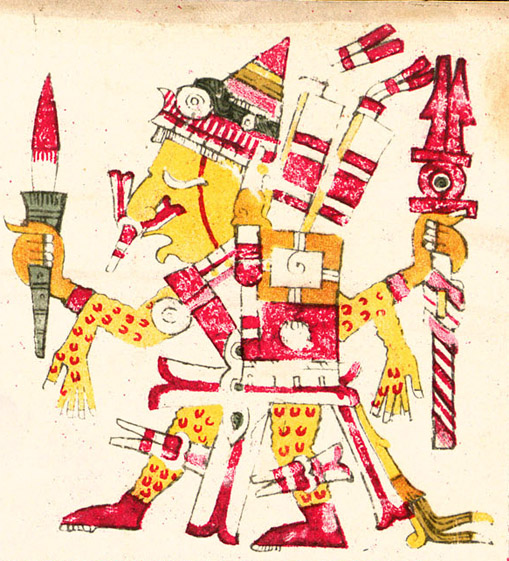
Codex Borgia

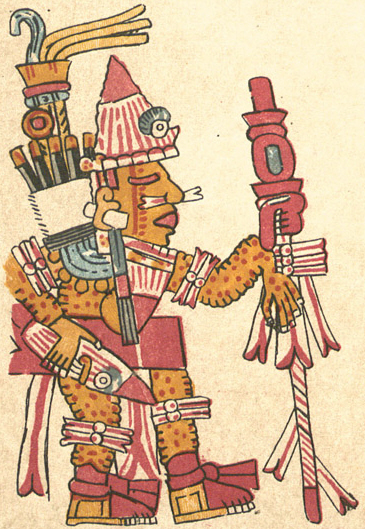
Codex Vaticanus B

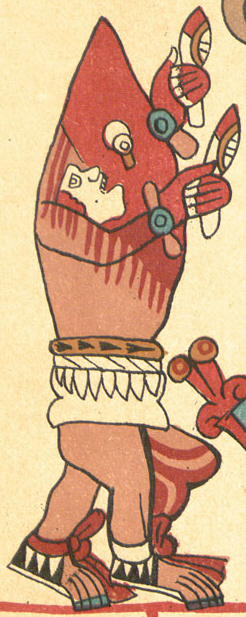
Tonalamatl Aubin

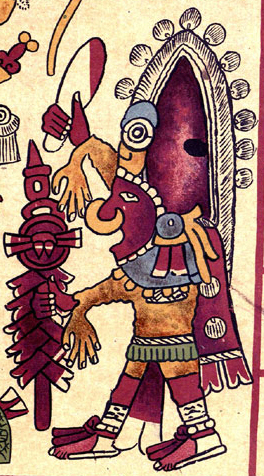
Codex Borbonicus

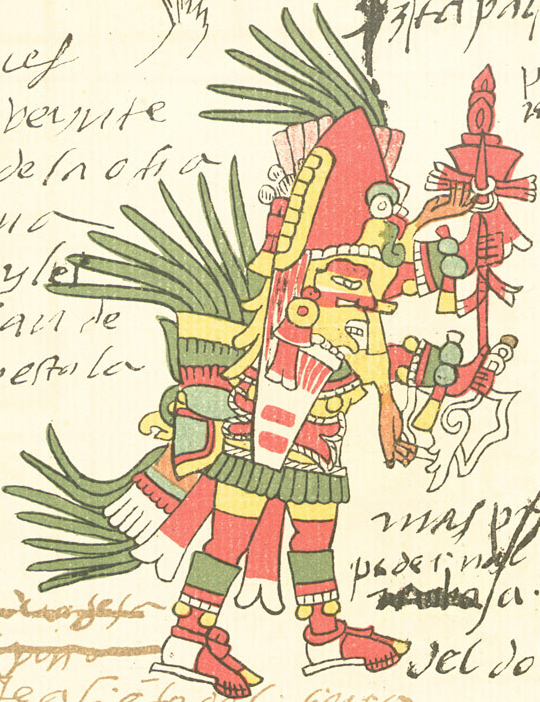
Codex Telleriano-Remensis

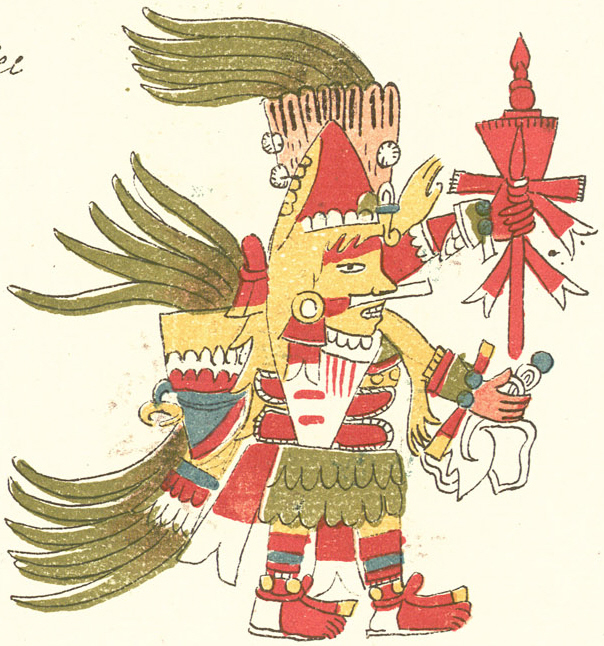
Codex Ríos

== See also ==
- Itztli
- Xipe Totec
