= Karl Anton Nowotny =

Austrian academic

Karl Anton Nowotny (June 21, 1904 in Hollabrunn – December 31, 1978 in Vienna) was an Austrian ethnographer, art historian and academic, specialising in the study of Mesoamerican cultures. He is most renowned for his analyses and reproductions of Mesoamerican codices, and his commentaries on their iconography and symbolism.

Nowotny was a pioneer and leading exponent of applying comparative ethnography to the study of pre-Columbian and conquest-era texts and codices. In this technique, the meaning and symbolism of the texts are analysed and compared with the cultural practices and beliefs of modern indigenous Mesoamerican peoples whose traditions have been maintained. Nowotny used comprehensive ethnographic studies—such as those conducted by Leonhard Schultze in the 1930s among the Nahuas of the central Mexican altiplano—as a means of garnering further insight into the ancestral practices and beliefs underpinning the codices and related iconographies.

Nowotny also contributed extensively to the study and interpretation of pre-Columbian Mesoamerican calendars, their functioning and how they were used. Building upon work by earlier scholars such as Eduard Seler, Nowotny and his contemporaries like Alfonso Caso and Paul Kirchhoff greatly added to the scholarly understanding of calendrical elements such as the central Mexican tonalpohualli, veintena and trecena cycles. Nowotny's analysis and exposition of the ritual and divinatory importance of the tonalamatl almanac has been regarded as of "critical importance" to the modern understanding of this almanac, and a significant development beyond the primarily astronomically based approach of Seler and other predecessors.
