= Eloise Quiñones Keber =

American art historian

Eloise Quiñones Keber (d. 2023) was professor emeritus of Art History at Baruch College and The Graduate Center, CUNY, where she specialized in Pre-Columbian and early colonial Latin American art. She earned her Ph.D. from Columbia University in 1984.

== Writings/Publications ==
She published a scholarly edition of the important Aztec pictorial Codex Telleriano-Remensis, with commentary, which received the 1996 Ralph Waldo Emerson Award for humanistic studies from the Phi Beta Kappa society. She also co-authored, with H.B. Nicholson, Art of Aztec Mexico (National Gallery of Art, 1983).

She edited Precious Greenstone, Precious Quetzal Feather (Labyrinthos, 2000), Chipping Away on Earth (Labyrinthos, 1994), co-edited with H.B. Nicholson Mixteca Puebla (Labyrinthos, 1994), and The Work of Bernardino de Sahagún: Pioneer Ethnographer of 16th-Century Aztec Mexico (University of Texas Press, 1988) with J. Jorge Klor de Alva and H.B. Nicholson.

== Honors ==
She received the Baruch College Presidential Excellence Award in 1996, and was a recipient of fellowships and grants from the Guggenheim Foundation, the American Council of Learned Societies, National Endowment for the Humanities, Ford Foundation, Mellon Foundation, Getty Foundation, and the American Philosophical Society.

She received the 1996 Ralph Waldo Emerson Award in humanistic studies from the Phi Beta Kappa society for Codex Telleriano Remensis and the 1996 Distinguished Scholarship Award from Baruch College, where she also teaches.

== Research ==
Prof. Quiñones-Keber's research interests centered primarily on Mesoamerican manuscripts, Aztec art before and after the Spanish conquest, and issues surrounding the encounter between indigenous and European traditions in the Americas. Most recently, she was working on a book on “reinventing Aztec art”, for which she was awarded a Guggenheim Fellowship in 1998–1999.
