= Trecena =

13-day period used in pre-Columbian Mesoamerican calendars

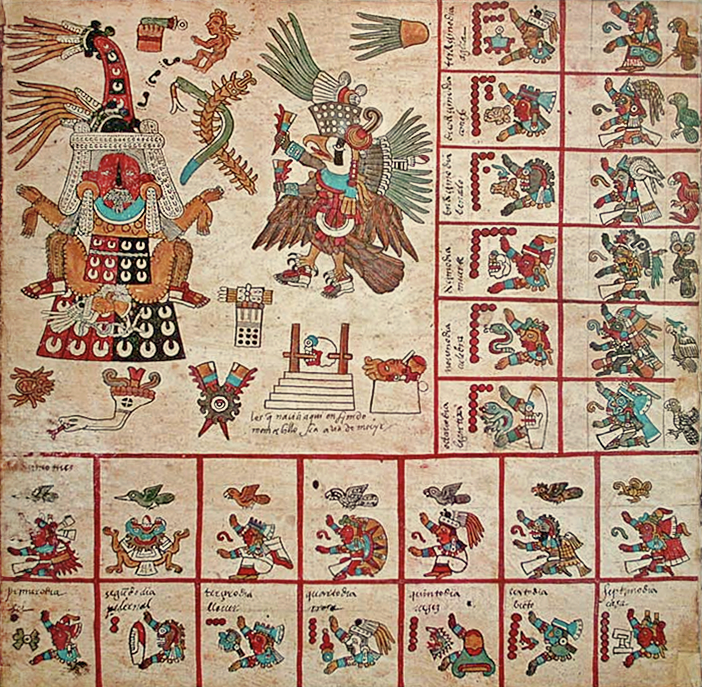
The original page 13 of the Codex Borbonicus, showing the 13th trecena of the Aztec sacred calendar. This 13th trecena was under the auspices of the goddess Tlazolteotl, who is shown on the upper left wearing a flayed skin, giving birth to Cinteotl. The 13 day-signs of this trecena, starting with 1 Earthquake, 2 Flint/Knife, 3 Rain, etc., are shown on the bottom row and the column along the right side.

A trecena (From Spanish: trece) is a 13-day period used in pre-Columbian Mesoamerican calendars. The 260-day Mayan calendar (the tonalpohualli) was divided into 20 trecenas. Trecena is derived from the Spanish chroniclers and translates to "a group of thirteen" in the same way that a dozen (or in Spanish docena) relates to the number twelve. It is associated with the Aztecs, but is called different names in the calendars of the Maya, Zapotec, Mixtec, and others of the region.

Many surviving Mesoamerican codices, such as Codex Borbonicus, are divinatory calendars, based on the 260-day year, with each page representing one trecena.

n.º	Trecena	Aztec deities associated	Cardinal point
1	1 Cipactli (Crocodile)	Tonacatecuhtli	East
2	1 Ocelotl (Jaguar)	Quetzalcoatl	North
3	1 Mazatl (Deer)	Tepeyollotl	West
4	1 Xochitl (Flower)	Huehuecoyotl	South
5	1 Acatl (Reed)	Chalchiuhtlicue	East
6	1 Miquiztli (Death)	Tonatiuh	North
7	1 Quiahuitl (Rain)	Tlaloc	West
8	1 Malinalli (Grass)	Mayahuel	South
9	1 Coatl (Serpent)	Xiuhtecuhtli	East
10	1 Tecpatl (Flint)	Mictlantecuhtli	North
11	1 Ozomatli (Monkey)	Patecatl	West
12	1 Cuetzpalin (Lizard)	Itztlacoliuhqui	South
13	1 Ollin (Movement)	Tlazolteotl	East
14	1 Itzcuintli (Dog)	Xipe Totec	North
15	1 Calli (House)	Itzpapalotl	West
16	1 Cozcacuauhtli (Vulture)	Xolotl	South
17	1 Atl (Water)	Chalchiuhtotolin	East
18	1 Ehecatl (Wind)	Chantico	North
19	1 Cuauhtli (Eagle)	Xochiquetzal	West
20	1 Tochtli (Rabbit)	Itztapaltotec	South

== See also ==
- Aztec calendar
- Maya calendar
- Tonalpohualli
- K'atun
