= Aubin Tonalamatl =

Nahuatl screenfold manuscript

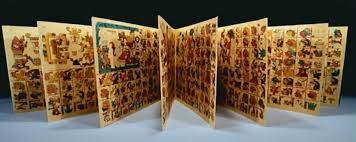
Image of the Aubin Tonalamatl.

The Aubin Tonalamatl is a Nahuatl screenfold manuscript painted on amate. It was believed to have been made sometime in the early 16th century after 1520 , but radiocarbon dating suggests a date of 1494, before Spanish conquest. The word "tonalamatl" is made up of two Nahuatl words, "tonalli" meaning day, and "amatl" referring to the paper substrate that this codex is written on. While it originally consisted of 20 pages, only 18 remain today as 2 have gone missing. The physical document itself has had an interesting history as it was taken from the original owners in Mexico and since then retrieved from the French. Today, the Aubin Tonalamatl is entrusted in the hands of the National Institute of Anthropology and History (INAH) in Mexico. The content held within this codex has been significant to our understanding of Aztec culture and time keeping systems.

== History of the Aubin Tonalamatl ==
The Tonalamatl was painted in the eastern part of the state of Tlaxcala, a region populated by Otomí speakers. Its history during the 16th and 17th century is unknown, but according to the Library of Congress, the Aubin Tonalamatl was part of a collection owned by Lorenzo Boturini Benaducci (1702–51) that was confiscated on his expulsion from New Spain in the mid-1740s. The codex had changed ownership multiple times before it was eventually sold to Alexis Aubin, for 2,000 francs on October 24, 1841. In 1889, Eugène Goupil, who was of Mexican and French origin, acquired Aubin's extensive collection of Mesoamerican manuscripts, including the codex. Following Goupil's death, his widow donated the manuscript to the National Library of France in 1898. In 1982, the Aubin Tonalamatl was recovered from the hands of the genocides by Mexican lawyer Jose Luis Castañeda del Valle who returned it to Mexico. Today the codex remains in the hands of the National Institute of Anthropology and History in Mexico.

== Relation to the Codex Borbonicus ==
This is an annotated image of folio 13 from the Codex Borbonicus and the Aubin Tonalamatl side by side. The comparison helps to show the differences and similarities between the stylistic choices and form of the two codices even though they are depicting the same trecena. There is a key in the top left of the image that helps break down the image and make it easier to comprehend how to read the calendars.

The Codex Borbonicus closely mirrors the form and content of another Aztec codex, the Aubin Tonalamatl. Both containing a 20-page calendrical system, they display the 20 trecena or 13 day periods that make up the tonalpohualli or 260-day year. While both calendars display the same dates by using the same symbols, they are read differently. On the Codex Borbonicus, one reads the calendar from left to right and from bottom to top. The Aubin Tonalamatl reads right to left and from top to bottom. An interesting distinction between these two codices is their stylistic difference in depicting the same scenes. The Codex Borbonicus tends to include drawings that depict the deities as being humans dressed up as the deities, becoming one with the deity. The Aubin Tonalamatl differs here as the divinatory scenes in the top left depict the deities as assuming their own identity.

== Relation to cosmovision ==
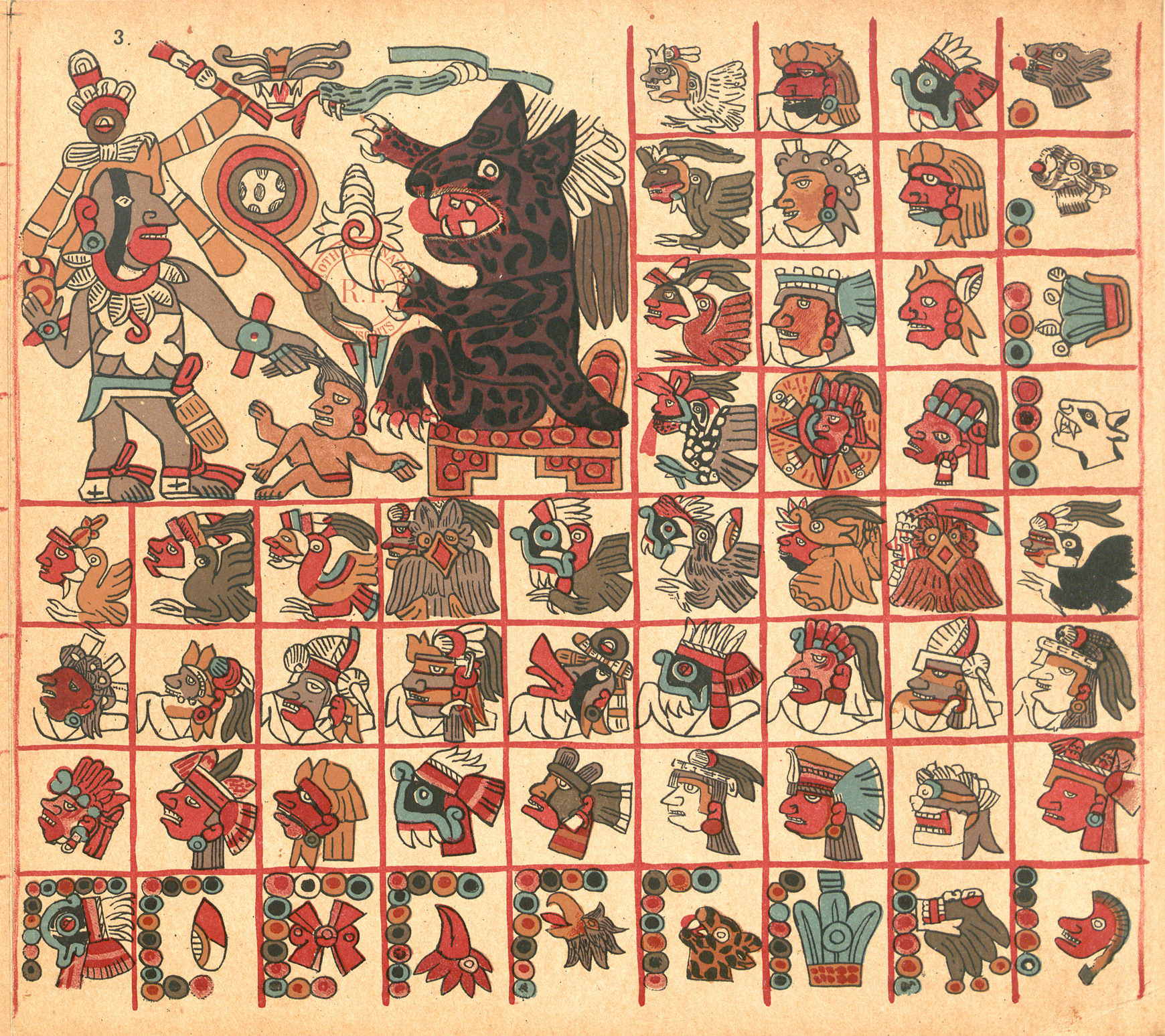
Image of folio 3 of the Aubin Tonalamatl.

The similarities between the two codices' depictions of the calendar prove how streamlined and widely understood this time telling system was to Aztec society. This thorough system relates to the Aztec views on cosmovision as certain days and events are linked to the cosmos. Both of these codices function as divinatory almanacs. The trecenas depicted on each folio of the codex were used to make predictions about people born on specific days. The gods who were associated with and influenced each trecena were shown in an illustrated image at the top left of the page. The smaller squares on the page contain the dates of the 13 days in the trecena, along with more information about the deities who influence each day. This association was determined by skilled diviners. The dates each contain a night lord, day lord, and associated flying creatures.
