= Quetzalcōātl =

Central deity in Aztec religion

Quetzalcoatl
- God of life, light, and wisdom, lord of the day and the winds. Ruler of the West
- Member of the Tezcatlipocas
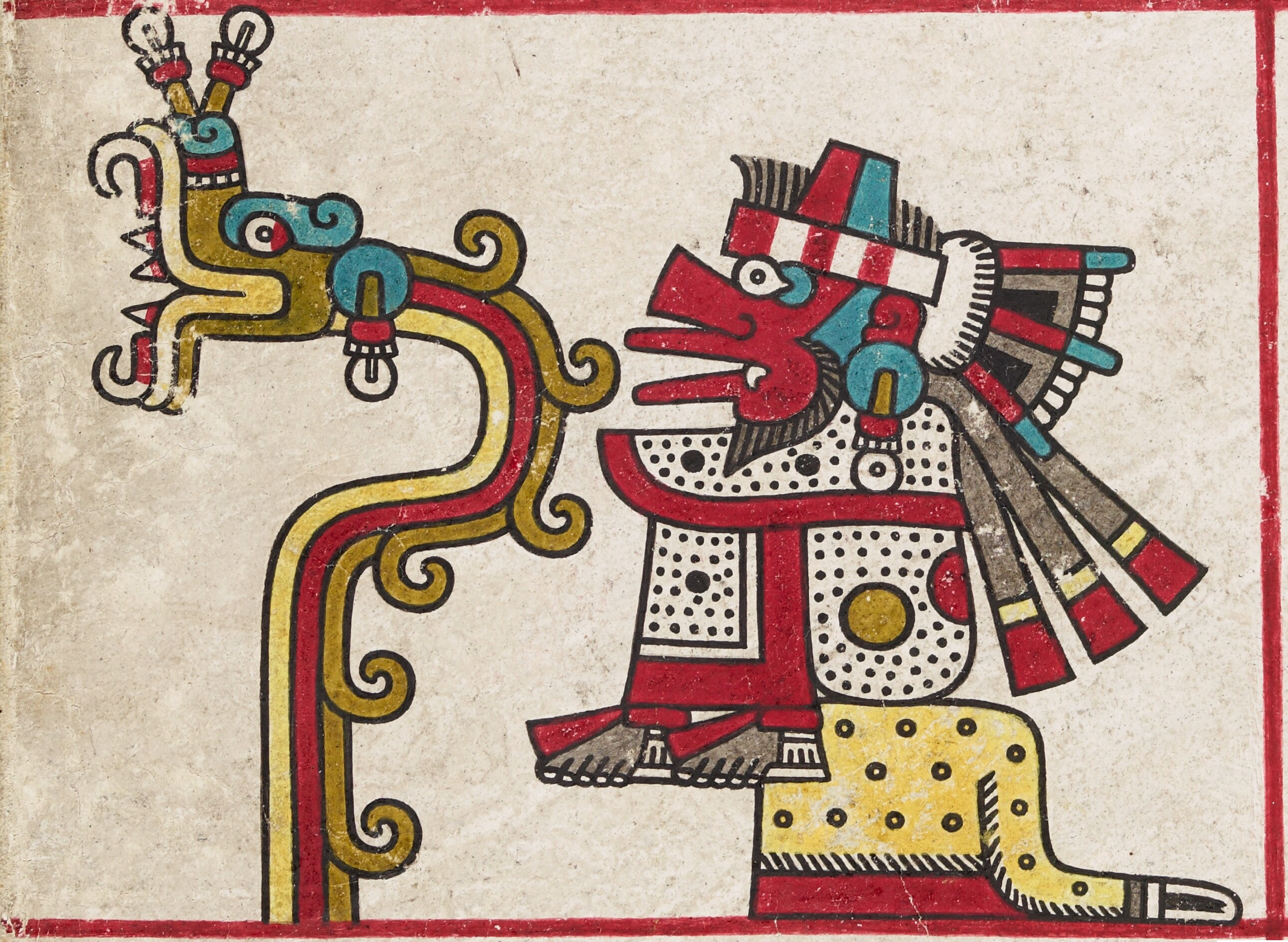
- Quetzalcoatl's two forms: the Feathered Serpent at the left, and Ehecatl, the god of wind at the right, depicted in Codex Laud
- Other names: White Tezcatlipoca, Ce Acatl Topiltzin Quetzalcoatl, Feathered Serpent, Precious Twin, Tlahuizcalpantecuhtli
- Major cult center: Temple of the Feathered Serpent, Teotihuacan, Tenochtitlan
- Abode: Ilhuicatl-Teteocan (Twelfth Heaven); Ilhuicatl-Teoiztac (Ninth Heaven); the West
- Planet: Venus (Morning-star)
- Symbol: Feathered Serpent
- Gender: Male
- Region: Mesoamerica
- Ethnic group: Aztec, Tlaxcaltec, Toltec Nahua
- Festivals: Teotleco

Genealogy
- Parents: Ometecuhtli and Omecihuatl (Codex Zumarraga); Mixcoatl and Chimalma (Codex Chimalpopoca)
- Siblings: Tezcatlipoca, Xipe-Totec, Huitzilopochtli (Codex Zumarraga); Xolotl (Codex Chimalpopoca)
- Children: None

Equivalents
- Maya: Kukulkan (God H) (Yucatan), Qʼuqʼumatz (Highland Guatemala)
- Mixtec: Ñuhu-Tachi
- Otomi: Ek’ënmaxi

Quetzalcoatl (/ˌkɛtsəlkoʊˈætəl/) (Note: Pronounced variously /ˌkwɛtsəlkoʊˈɑːtəlˌ -ˈkwɑːtəl/; Spanish: Quetzalcóatl Spanish pronunciation: [ketsalˈkoatl]; Classical Nahuatl: Quetzalcōātl [ket͡salˈkoːʷaːt͡ɬ] (Modern Nahuatl pronunciation), in honorific form: Quetzalcōātzin).) (Nahuatl: "Feathered Serpent") is a deity in Aztec culture and literature. Among the Aztecs, he was related to wind, the planet Venus, the Sun, merchants, arts, crafts, knowledge, and learning. He was also the patron god of the Aztec priesthood. He is also a god of wisdom, learning and intelligence. He was one of several important gods in the Aztec pantheon, along with the gods Tlaloc, Tezcatlipoca and Huitzilopochtli. The two other gods represented by the planet Venus are Tlaloc (ally and the god of rain) and Xolotl (psychopomp and its twin).

Quetzalcoatl wears around his neck the breastplate ehēcacōzcatl, "the spirally voluted wind jewel". This talisman was a conch shell cut at the cross-section and was likely worn as a necklace by religious rulers, as such objects have been discovered in burials in archaeological sites throughout Mesoamerica, and potentially symbolized patterns witnessed in hurricanes, dust devils, seashells, and whirlpools, which were elemental forces that had significance in Aztec mythology. Codex drawings pictured both Quetzalcoatl and Xolotl wearing an ehēcacōzcatl around the neck.

In the era following the 16th-century Spanish conquest of the Aztec Empire, a number of records conflated Quetzalcoatl with Ce Acatl Topiltzin, a ruler of the mythico-historic city of Tollan. Historians debate to what degree, or whether at all, these narratives about this legendary Toltec ruler describe historical events. Furthermore, early Spanish sources written by clerics tend to identify the god-ruler Quetzalcoatl of these narratives with either Hernán Cortés or Thomas the Apostle—identifications which have also become sources of a diversity of opinions about the nature of Quetzalcoatl.

== Worship ==
At least one major cache of offerings includes knives and idols adorned with the symbols of more than one god, some of which were adorned with wind jewels. Animals thought to represent Quetzalcoatl include resplendent quetzals, rattlesnakes (coatl meaning "serpent" in Nahuatl), crows, and macaws. In his form as Ehecatl he is the wind, and is represented by spider monkeys, ducks, and the wind itself. In his form as the morning star, Venus, he is also depicted as a harpy eagle. In Mazatec legends, the astrologer deity Tlahuizcalpanteuctli, who is also represented by Venus, bears a close relationship with Quetzalcoatl.

The earliest known documentation of the worship of a Feathered Serpent occurs in Teotihuacan in the first century BC or first century AD. That period lies within the Late Preclassic to Early Classic period (400 BC – 600 AD) of Mesoamerican chronology; veneration of the figure appears to have spread throughout Mesoamerica by the Late Classic period (600–900 AD). In the Postclassic period (900–1519 AD), the worship of the feathered-serpent deity centered in the primary Mexican religious center of Cholula. In this period the deity is known to have been named Quetzalcōhuātl by his Nahua followers. In the Maya area he was approximately equivalent to Kukulkan and Gukumatz, names that also roughly translate as "feathered serpent" in different Mayan languages.

== Etymology ==
The name Quetzalcoatl comes from Nahuatl and means "Precious serpent" or "Quetzal-feathered Serpent". In the 17th century, Ixtlilxóchitl, a descendant of Aztec royalty and historian of the Nahua people, wrote, "Quetzalcoatl, in its literal sense, means 'serpent of precious feathers' but in the allegorical sense, 'wisest of men'."

== Feathered serpent deity in Mesoamerica ==
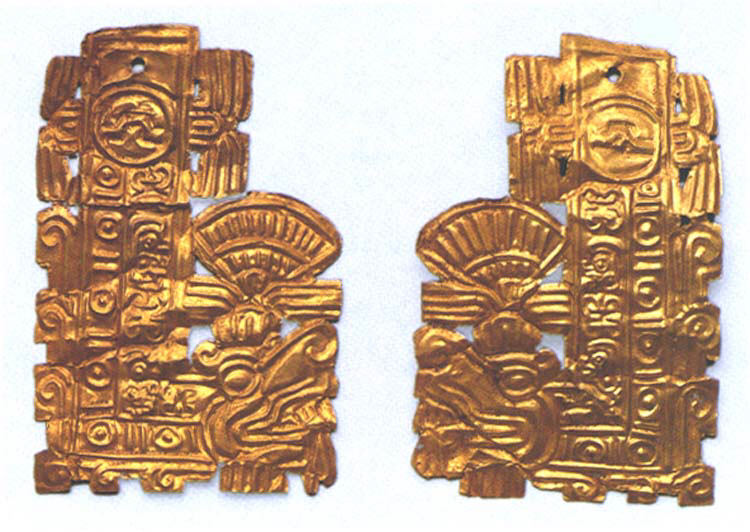
Gold feathered serpent Ornament

In Mesoamerican history, many different ethnopolitical groups worshiped a feathered-serpent deity. Evidence of such worship comes from the iconography of different Mesoamerican cultures, in which serpent motifs occur frequently. On the basis of the different symbolic systems used in portrayals of the feathered-serpent deity in different cultures and periods, scholars have interpreted the religious and symbolic meaning of the feathered-serpent deity in Mesoamerican cultures.

=== Iconographic depictions ===
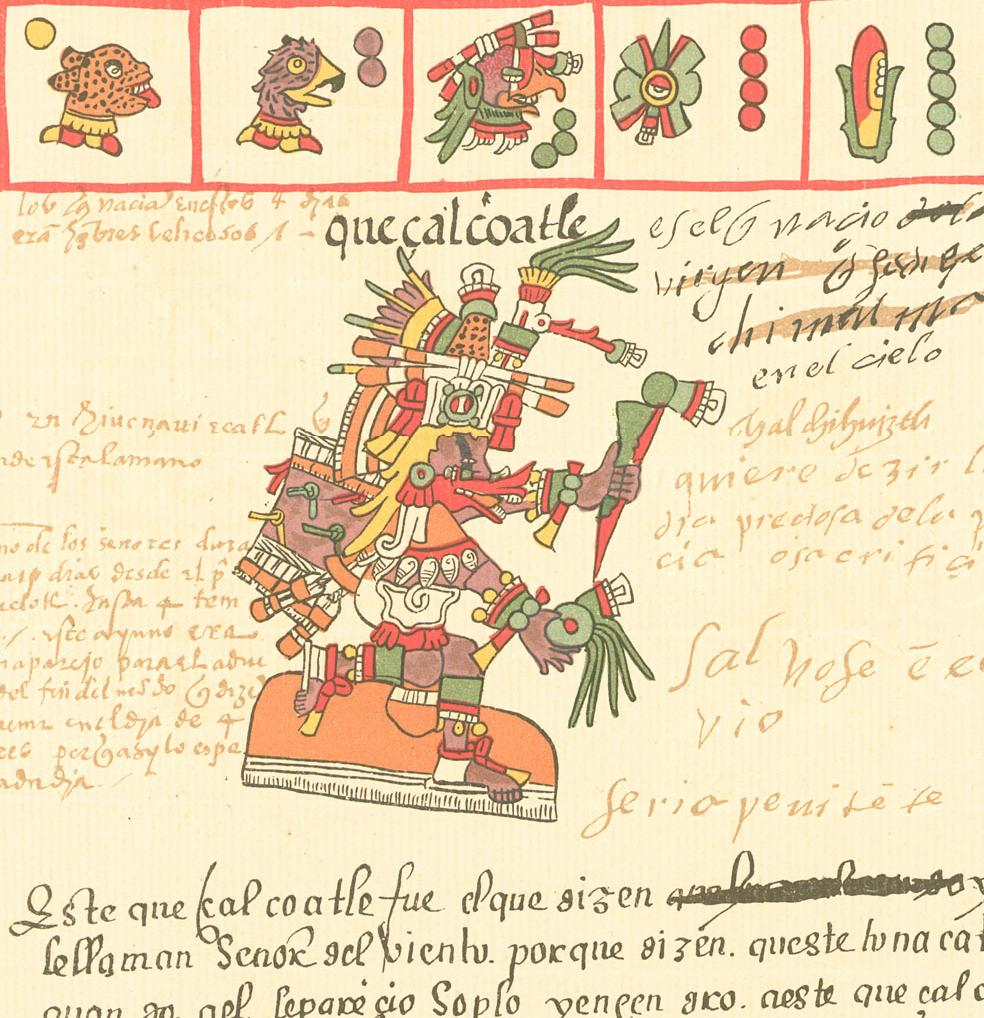
Quetzalcoatl as depicted in the Codex Telleriano-Remensis

The earliest known iconographic depiction of the deity appears on Stela 19 at the Olmec site of La Venta. Dated to around 900 BC, it depicts a serpent rising up behind a person probably engaged in a shamanic ritual. Although probably not exactly a depiction of the same feathered-serpent deity worshipped in classic and post-classic periods, it shows the continuity of symbolism of feathered snakes in Mesoamerica from the formative period and on, for example in comparison to the Maya Vision Serpent shown below.

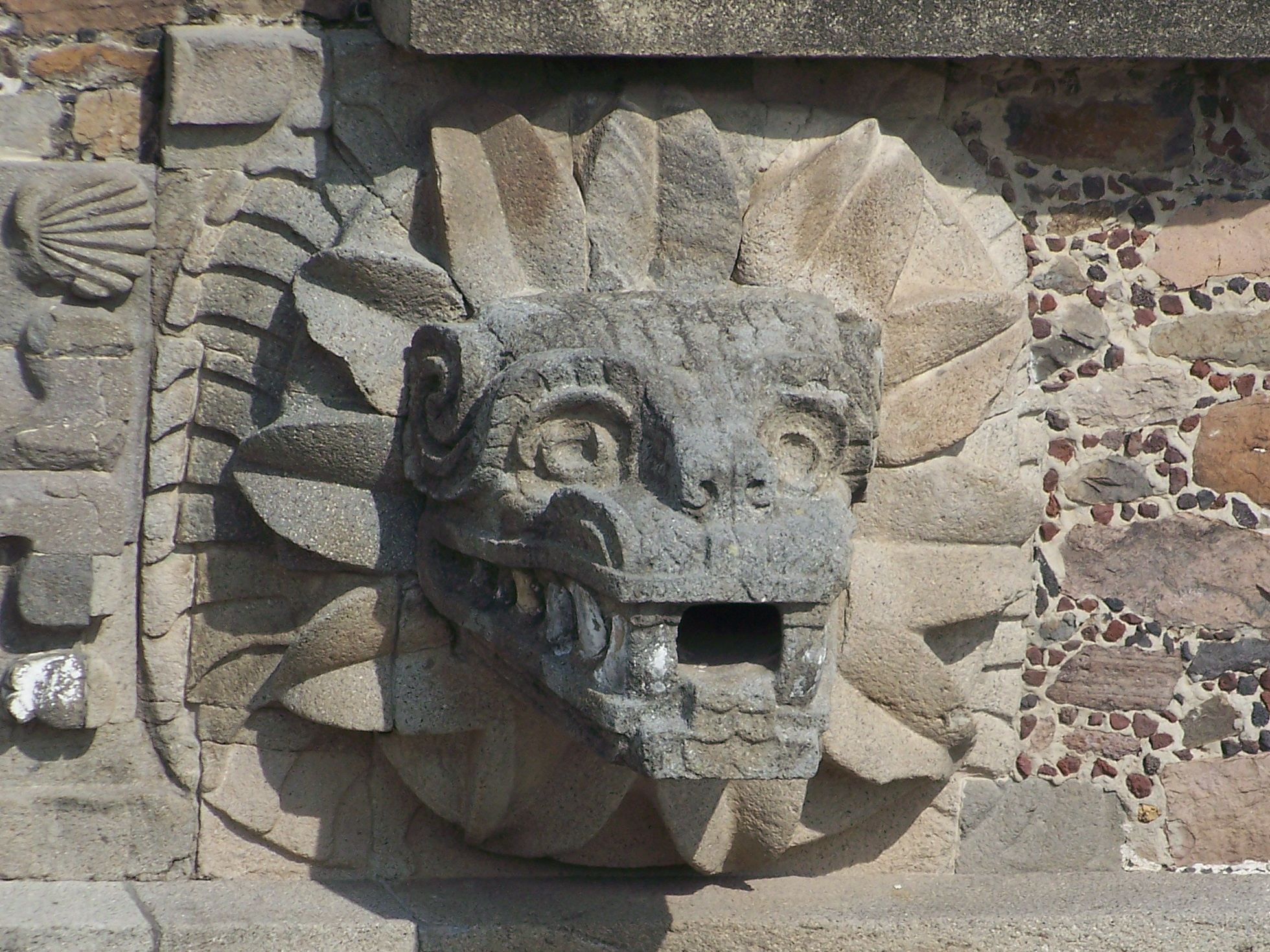
Feathered Serpent head at the Ciudadela complex in Teotihuacan

The first culture to use the symbol of a feathered serpent as an important religious and political symbol was that of Teotihuacan. At temples such as the aptly named "Quetzalcoatl temple" in the Ciudadela complex, feathered serpents figure prominently and alternate with a different kind of serpent head. The earliest depictions of the feathered serpent deity were fully zoomorphic, depicting the serpent as an actual snake, but already among the Classic Maya, images of the deity began acquiring human features, such as the beard (see the Borgia codex illustration below) that he was sometimes depicted with.

In the iconography of the classic period, Maya serpent imagery is also prevalent: a snake often appears as the embodiment of the sky itself, and a vision serpent is a shamanic helper presenting Maya kings with visions of the underworld.

Vector image of Quetzalcoatl as depicted in Codex Borbonicus.

The archaeological record shows that after the fall of Teotihuacan that marked the beginning of the epi-classic period in Mesoamerican chronology around 600 AD, the cult of the feathered serpent spread to new religious and political centers in central Mexico, centers such as Xochicalco, Cacaxtla and Cholula. Feathered-serpent iconography is prominent at all of these sites. Cholula remained the most important center of worship of Quetzalcoatl, the Aztec/Nahua version of the feathered-serpent deity, in the post-classic period.

During the epi-classic period, a dramatic spread of feathered serpent iconography is evidenced throughout Mesoamerica, and during this period images begin to figure prominently at sites such as Chichén Itzá, El Tajín, and throughout the Maya area. Colonial documentary sources from the Maya area frequently speak of the arrival of foreigners from the central Mexican plateau, often led by a man whose name translates as "Feathered Serpent". It has been suggested that these stories recall the spread of the feathered-serpent cult in the epi-classic and early post-classic periods.

Represented as the plumed serpent, Quetzalcoatl was also seen as a manifestation of the wind, one of the most powerful forces of nature; a text in the Nahuatl language captures this relationship:

Quetzalcoatl; yn ehecatl ynteiacancauh yntlachpancauh in tlaloque, yn aoaque, yn qujqujiauhti. Auh yn jquac molhuja eheca, mjtoa: teuhtli quaqualaca, ycoioca, tetecujca, tlatlaiooa, tlatlapitza, tlatlatzinj, motlatlaueltia.

Quetzalcoatl—he was the wind, the guide and road sweeper of the rain gods, of the masters of the water, of those who brought rain. And when the wind rose, when the dust rumbled, and it crack and there was a great din, became it became dark and the wind blew in many directions, and it thundered; then it was said: "[Quetzalcoatl] is wrathful."

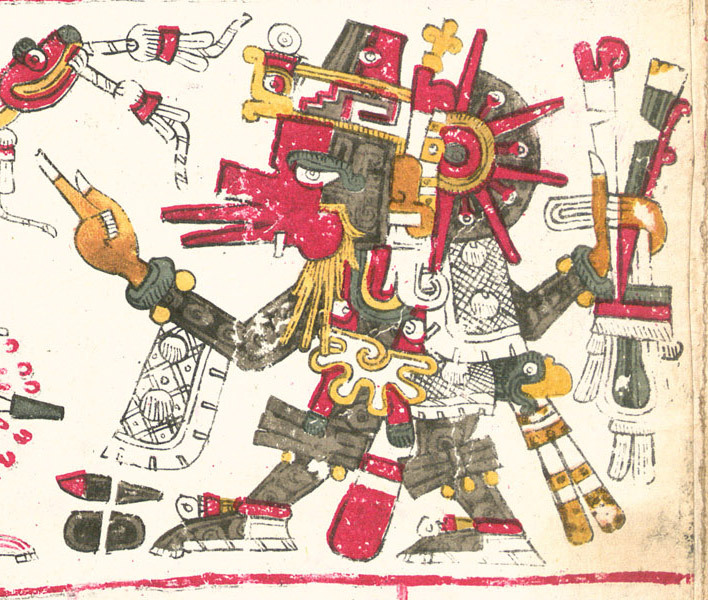
Quetzalcoatl in the Codex Borgia.

Quetzalcoatl also became linked with rulership and priestly office; additionally, among the Toltec, the name was used as a military title and its representation as an emblem.

In the post-classic Nahua civilization of central Mexico (Aztec), the worship of Quetzalcoatl was ubiquitous. Cult worship may have involved the ingestion of hallucinogenic mushrooms (psilocybes), considered sacred. The most important center was Cholula, where the world's largest pyramid was dedicated to Quetzalcoatl-worship. In Aztec culture, depictions of Quetzalcoatl were fully anthropomorphic. Quetzalcoatl was associated with the wind-god Ehecatl and is often depicted with his insignia: a beak-like mask.

=== Interpretations ===
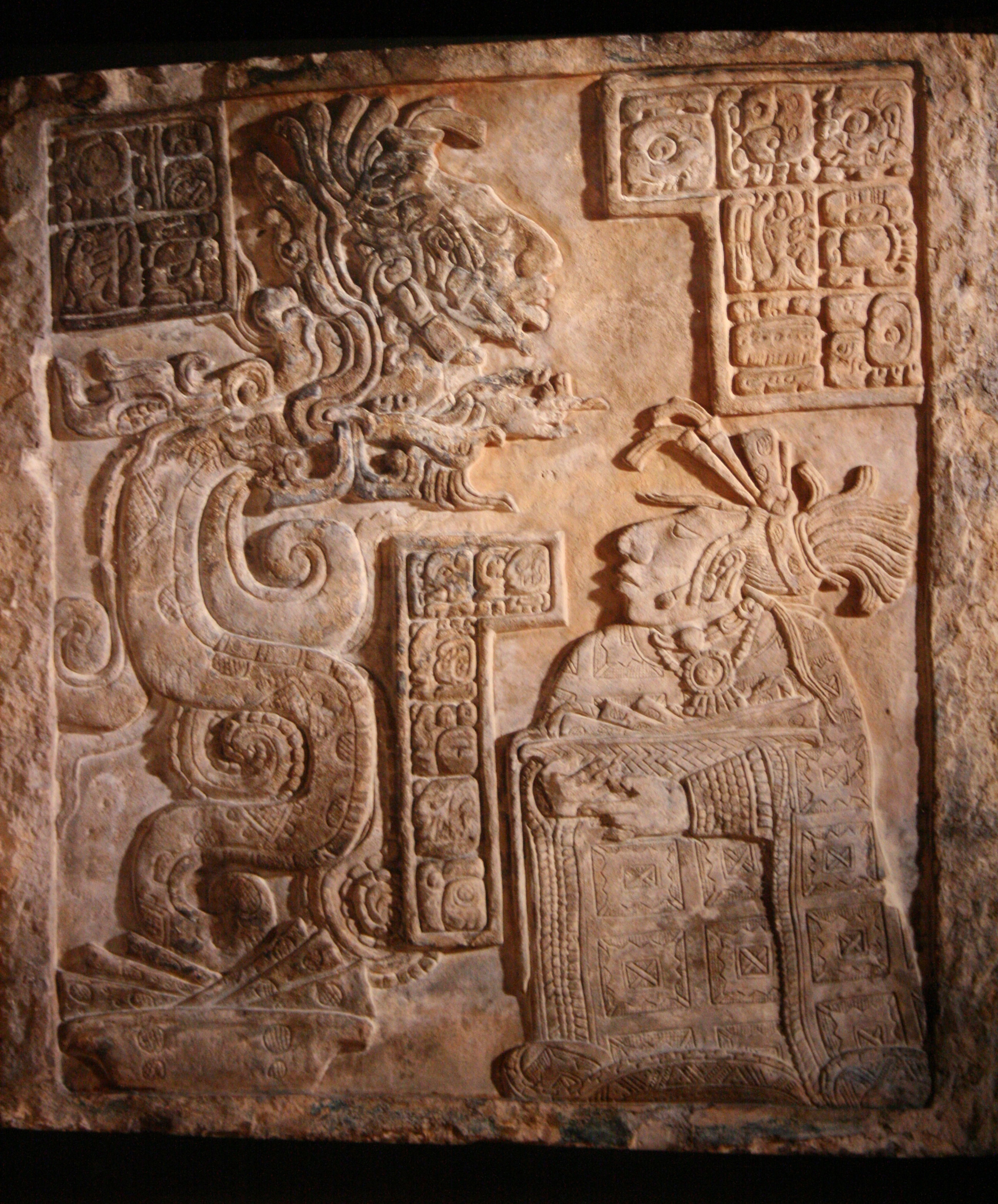
Vision Serpent depicted on lintel 15 from Yaxchilan

On the basis of the Teotihuacan iconographical depictions of the feathered serpent, archaeologist Karl Taube has argued that the feathered serpent was a symbol of fertility and of internal political structures - contrasting with the War Serpent symbolizing the outwards military expansion of the Teotihuacan empire. Historian Enrique Florescano - also analyzing Teotihuacan iconography - argues that the Feathered Serpent was part of a triad of agricultural deities:

- the Goddess of the Cave, symbolizing motherhood, reproduction and life
- Tlaloc, god of rain, lightning and thunder
- the feathered serpent, god of vegetational renewal

The feathered serpent was furthermore connected to the planet Venus because of this planet's importance as a sign of the beginning of the rainy season. To both Teotihuacan and Maya cultures, Venus was in turn also symbolically connected with warfare.

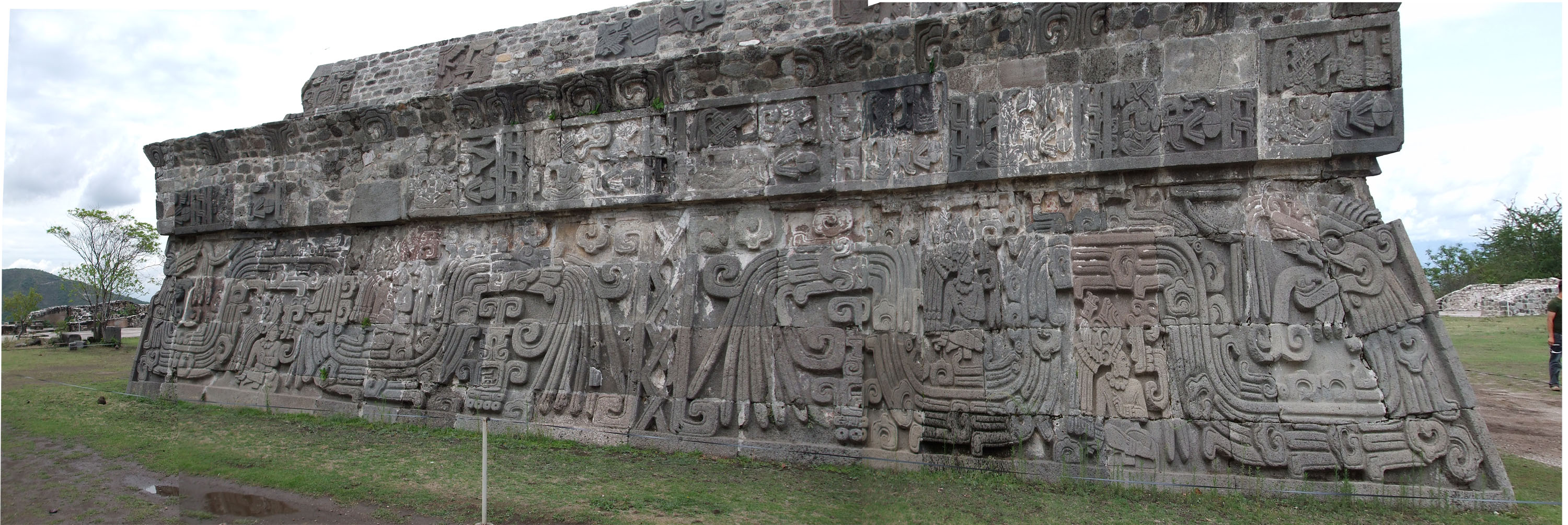
Temple of the Feathered Serpent at Xochicalco, adorned with a fully zoomorphic feathered serpent

Classic Maya serpent iconography seems related to the belief in a sky-, Venus-, creator-, war- and fertility-related serpent deity. In an example from Yaxchilan, the Vision Serpent has the human face of the young maize-god, further suggesting a connection to fertility and vegetational renewal; the Maya Young Maize god was also connected to Venus.

In Xochicalco, depictions of the feathered serpent accompany the image of a seated, armed ruler and the hieroglyph for the day sign 9 Wind. The date 9 Wind is known to be associated with fertility, Venus and war among the Maya and frequently occurs in relation to Quetzalcoatl in other Mesoamerican cultures.

On the basis of the iconography of the feathered-serpent deity at sites such as Teotihuacan, Xochicalco, Chichén Itzá, Tula and Tenochtitlan combined with certain ethnohistorical sources, historian David Carrasco has argued that the preeminent function of the feathered-serpent deity throughout Mesoamerican history was as the patron deity of the urban center - a god of culture and civilization.

== In Aztec culture ==
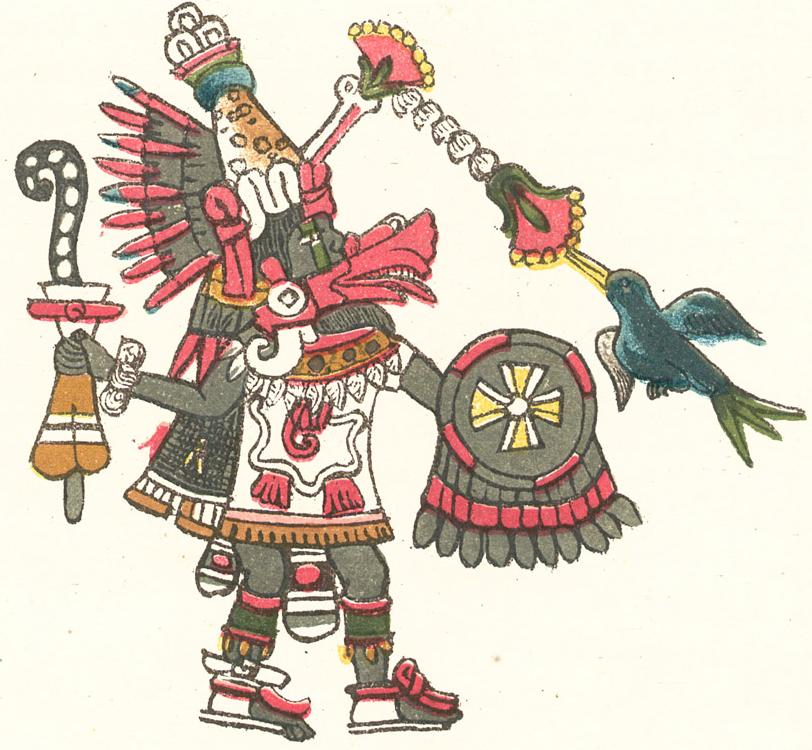
Quetzalcoatl as depicted in the Codex Magliabechiano

To the Aztecs, Quetzalcoatl was, as his name indicates, a feathered serpent. He was a creator deity having contributed essentially to the creation of mankind. He also had anthropomorphic forms, for example in his aspects as Ehecatl the wind god. Among the Aztecs, the name Quetzalcoatl was also a priestly title, as the two most important priests of the Aztec Templo Mayor were called "Quetzalcoatl Tlamacazqui". In the Aztec ritual calendar, different deities were associated with the cycle-of-year names: Quetzalcoatl was tied to the year Ce Acatl (One Reed), which correlates to the year 1519.

== Myths ==
=== Attributes ===
The exact significance and attributes of Quetzalcoatl varied somewhat between civilizations and through history. There are several stories about the birth of Quetzalcoatl. In a version of the myth, Quetzalcoatl was born by a virgin named Chimalman, to whom the god Ometeotl appeared in a dream. In another story, the virgin Chimalman conceived Quetzalcoatl by swallowing an emerald. A third story narrates that Chimalman was hit in the womb by an arrow shot by Mixcoatl and nine months later she gave birth to a child which was called Quetzalcoatl. A fourth story narrates that Quetzalcoatl was born from Coatlicue, who already had four hundred children who formed the stars of the Milky Way.

According to another version of the myth, Quetzalcoatl is one of the four sons of Ometecuhtli and Omecihuatl, the four Tezcatlipocas, each of whom presided over one of the four cardinal directions. Over the West presides the White Tezcatlipoca, Quetzalcoatl, the god of light, justice, mercy and wind. Over the South presides the Blue Tezcatlipoca, Huitzilopochtli, the god of war. Over the East presides the Red Tezcatlipoca, Xipe Totec, the god of gold, farming and springtime. And over the North presides the Black Tezcatlipoca, known by no other name than Tezcatlipoca, the god of judgment, night, deceit, sorcery and the Earth. Quetzalcoatl was often considered the god of the morning star, and his twin brother Xolotl was the evening star (Venus). As the morning star, he was known by the title Tlahuizcalpantecuhtli, meaning "lord of the star of the dawn". He was known as the inventor of books and the calendar, the giver of maize (corn) to mankind, and sometimes as a symbol of death and resurrection. Quetzalcoatl was also the patron of the priests and the title of the twin Aztec high priests. Some legends describe him as opposed to human sacrifice while others describe him practicing it.

Most Mesoamerican beliefs included cycles of suns. Often our current time was considered the fifth sun, the previous four having been destroyed by floods, rains of fire, intense winds, and jaguars. Quetzalcoatl went to Mictlan, the underworld, and created fifth-world mankind from the bones of the previous races (with the help of Cihuacoatl), using his own blood, from a wound he inflicted on his earlobes, calves, tongue, and penis, to imbue the bones with new life.

It is also suggested that he was a son of Xochiquetzal and Mixcoatl.

In the Codex Chimalpopoca, it is said Quetzalcoatl was coerced by Tezcatlipoca into becoming drunk on pulque, cavorting with his older sister, Quetzalpetlatl, a celibate priestess, and neglecting their religious duties. (Many academics conclude this passage implies incest.) The next morning, Quetzalcoatl, feeling shame and regret, had his servants build him a stone chest, adorn him in turquoise, and then, laying in the chest, set himself on fire. His ashes rose into the sky and then his heart followed, becoming the morning star (see Tlahuizcalpantecuhtli).

He is also attributed with having brought the cacao plant from a sacred mountain to the Toltec people, teaching the women how to make traditional drinking chocolate.

== Belief in Cortés as Quetzalcoatl ==
Since the sixteenth century, it has been widely held that the Aztec Emperor Moctezuma II initially believed the landing of Hernán Cortés in 1519 to be Quetzalcoatl's return. This view has been questioned by ethno-historians who argue that the Quetzalcoatl-Cortés connection is not found in any document that was created independently of post-Conquest Spanish influence, and that there is little proof of a pre-Hispanic belief in Quetzalcoatl's return. Most documents expounding this theory are of entirely Spanish origin, such as Cortés's letters to Charles V of Spain, in which Cortés goes to great pains to present the naive gullibility of the Aztecs in general as a great aid in the conquest of the Aztec Empire.

Much of the idea of Cortés being seen as a deity can be traced back to the Florentine Codex written down some 50 years after the conquest. In the Codex's description of the first meeting between Moctezuma and Cortés, the Aztec ruler is described as giving a prepared speech in classical oratorial Nahuatl, a speech which, as described in the codex written by the Franciscan Bernardino de Sahagún and his Tlatelolcan informants, included such prostrate declarations of divine or near-divine admiration as:

You have graciously come on earth, you have graciously approached your water, your high place of Mexico, you have come down to your mat, your throne, which I have briefly kept for you, I who used to keep it for you.

and:

You have graciously arrived, you have known pain, you have known weariness, now come on earth, take your rest, enter into your palace, rest your limbs; may our lords come on earth.

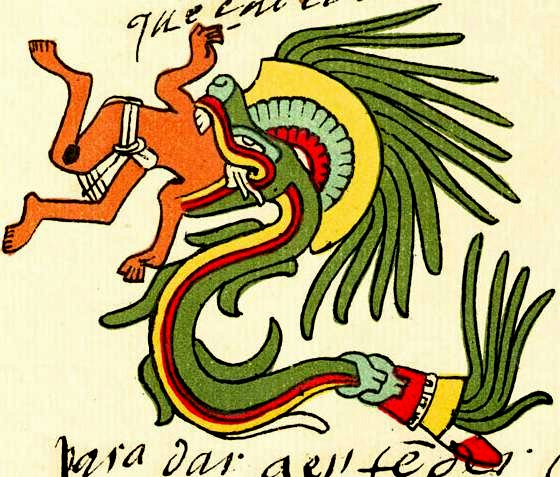
Quetzalcoatl in feathered-serpent form as depicted in the Codex Telleriano-Remensis

The exact intent of these words is uncertain. The rhetorical style of classic Nahuatl was full of subtle nuances and is still not well understood. Matthew Restall argues that if Moctezuma's politely offered his throne to Cortés, it may have been meant as the exact opposite since politeness in Aztec culture was a way to assert dominance and show superiority. This speech, which has been widely referred to, has been a factor in the widespread belief that Moctezuma was addressing Cortés as the returning god Quetzalcoatl.

Other parties have also promulgated the idea that the Mesoamericans believed the conquistadors, and in particular Cortés, to be awaited gods: most notably the historians of the Franciscan order such as Fray Gerónimo de Mendieta. Some Franciscans at this time held millennarian beliefs and some of them believed that Cortés' coming to the New World ushered in the final era of evangelization before the coming of the millennium. Franciscans such as Toribio de Benavente "Motolinia" saw elements of Christianity in the pre-Columbian religions and therefore believed that Mesoamerica had been evangelized before, possibly by Thomas the Apostle, who, according to legend, had "gone to preach beyond the Ganges". Franciscans then equated the original Quetzalcoatl with Thomas and imagined that the Indians had long-awaited his return to take part once again in God's kingdom. Historian Matthew Restall concludes that:

The legend of the returning lords, originated during the Spanish-Mexica war in Cortés' reworking of Moctezuma's welcome speech, had by the 1550s merged with the Cortés-as-Quetzalcoatl legend that the Franciscans had started spreading in the 1530s

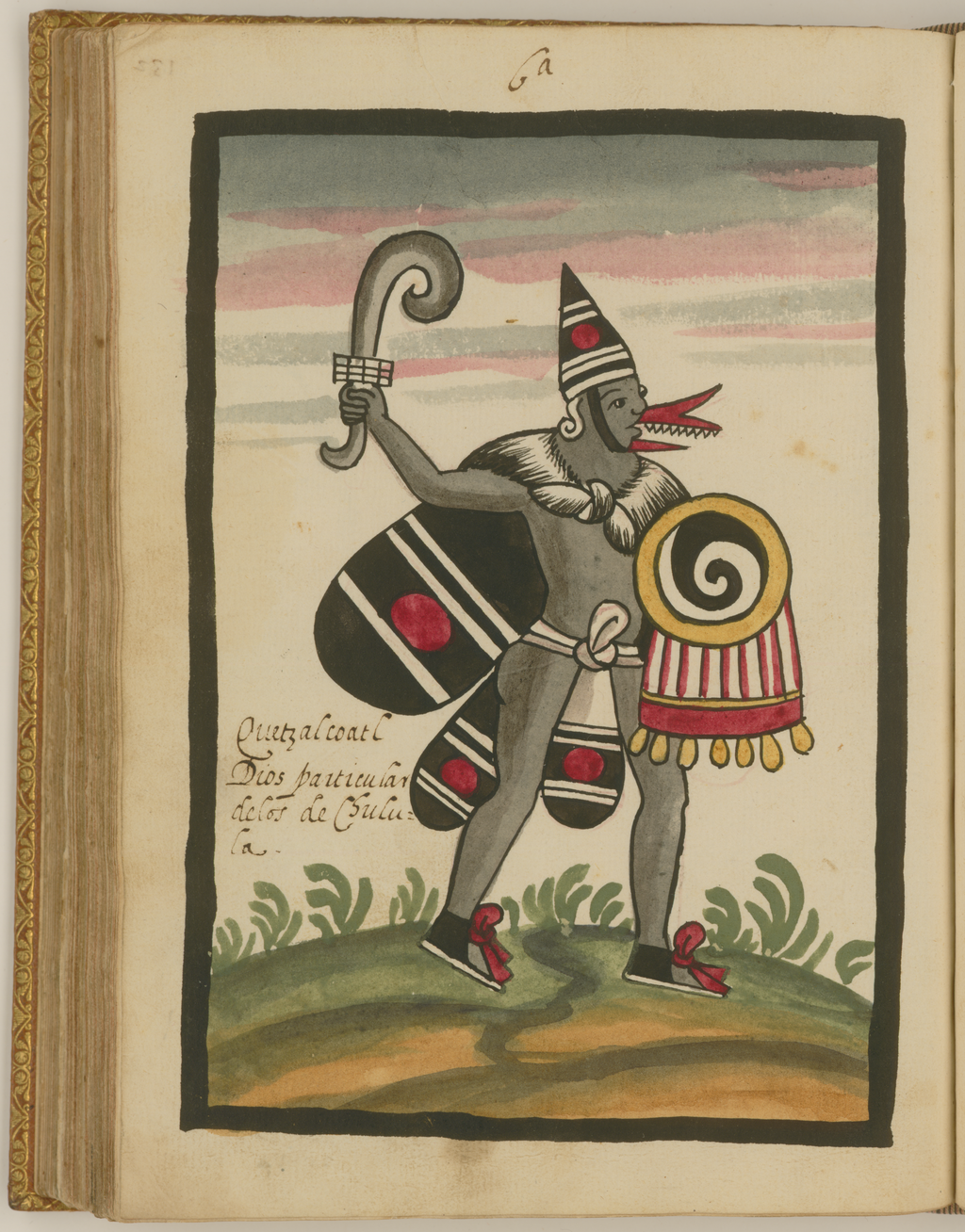
Quetzalcoatl as depicted in the post-Conquest Tovar Codex

Some scholarship maintains the view that the Aztec Empire's fall may be attributed in part to the belief in Cortés as the returning Quetzalcoatl, notably in works by David Carrasco (1982), H. B. Nicholson (2001 (1957)) and John Pohl (2016). Carrasco's work was revised in 2000, and the new edition provides a valuable overview of the controversy about Cortes and Quetzalcoatl. However, a majority of Mesoamericanist scholars, such as Matthew Restall (2003, 2018), James Lockhart (1994), Susan D. Gillespie (1989), Camilla Townsend (2003a, 2003b), Louise Burkhart, Michel Graulich and Michael E. Smith (2003), among others, consider the "Quetzalcoatl/Cortés myth" as one of many myths about the Spanish conquest which have risen in the early post-conquest period.

There is no question that the legend of Quetzalcoatl played a significant role in the colonial period. However, this legend likely has a foundation in events that took place immediately prior to the arrival of the Spaniards. A 2012 exhibition at the Los Angeles County Museum of Art and the Dallas Museum of Art, "The Children of the Plumed Serpent: the Legacy of Quetzalcoatl in Ancient Mexico", demonstrated the existence of a powerful confederacy of Eastern Nahuas, Mixtecs and Zapotecs, along with the peoples they dominated throughout southern Mexico between 1200 and 1600 (Pohl, Fields, and Lyall 2012, Harvey 2012, Pohl 2003). They maintained a major pilgrimage and commercial center at Cholula, Puebla which the Spaniards compared to both Rome and Mecca because the cult of the god united its constituents through a field of common social, political, and religious values without dominating them militarily. This confederacy engaged in almost seventy-five years of nearly continuous conflict with the Aztec Empire of the Triple Alliance until the arrival of Cortés. Members of this confederacy from Tlaxcala, Puebla, and Oaxaca provided the Spaniards with the army that first reclaimed the city of Cholula from its pro-Aztec ruling faction, and ultimately defeated the Aztec capital of Tenochtitlan (Mexico City). The Tlaxcalteca, along with other city-states across the Plain of Puebla, then supplied the auxiliary and logistical support for the conquests of Guatemala and West Mexico while Mixtec and Zapotec caciques (Colonial indigenous rulers) gained monopolies in the overland transport of Manila galleon trade through Mexico, and formed highly lucrative relationships with the Dominican order in the new Spanish imperial world economic system that explains so much of the enduring legacy of indigenous life-ways that characterize southern Mexico and explain the popularity of the Quetzalcoatl legends that continued through the colonial period to the present day.

== Contemporary use ==
=== Latter Day Saints movement ===
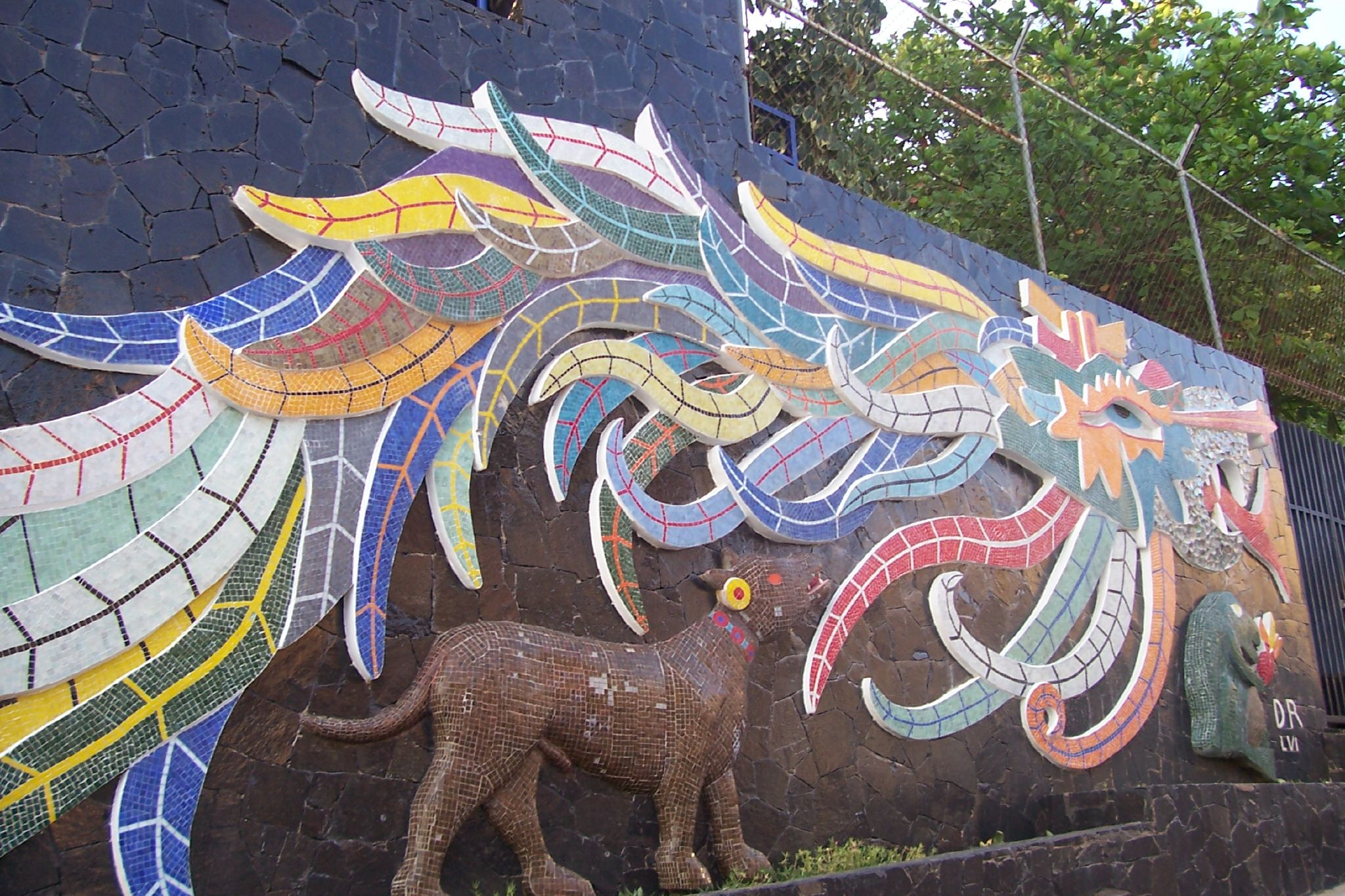
Quetzalcoatl Mural in Acapulco by Diego Rivera

According to the Book of Mormon, the resurrected Jesus Christ descended from heaven and visited the people of the American continent, shortly after his resurrection. Based on the Book of Mormon account, some followers of the Latter Day Saints movement believe that Quetzalcoatl was Jesus Christ, but that his name and the details of the event were gradually lost over time.

Quetzalcoatl is not a religious symbol in the Latter-day Saint faith, and is not taught as such, nor is it in their doctrine that Quetzalcoatl is Jesus. However, in an 1882 publication, LDS Church president John Taylor wrote:

The story of the life of the Mexican divinity, Quetzalcoatl, closely resembles that of the Savior; so closely, indeed, that we can come to no other conclusion than that Quetzalcoatl and Christ are the same being. But the history of the former has been handed down to us through an impure Lamanitish source, which has sadly disfigured and perverted the original incidents and teachings of the Savior's life and ministry.

— Mediation and Atonement, p. 194

Latter-day Saint author Brant Gardner, after investigating the link between Quetzalcoatl and Jesus, concluded that the association amounts to nothing more than folklore. In a 1986 paper for Sunstone, he noted that during the Spanish Conquest, the Native Americans and the Catholic priests who sympathized with them felt pressure to link Native American beliefs with Christianity, thus making the Native Americans seem more human and less savage. Over time, Quetzalcoatl's appearance, clothing, malevolent nature, and status among the gods were reshaped to fit a more Christian framework.

=== Other uses ===
In 1971, Tony Shearer published a book called Lord of the Dawn: Quetzalcoatl and the Tree of Life, inspiring New Age followers to visit Chichen Itza at the summer solstice when dragon-shaped shadows are cast by the Kulkulcan pyramid. The pterosaur Quetzalcoatlus was named after the deity in 1975. Quetzalcoatl was also fictionalized in the 1982 film Q as a monster that terrorizes New York City.

== See also ==
- Five Suns, a legend of Quetzalcōātl and his brothers
- Kukulkan
- Quetzalcoatlus, a pterosaur from the Late Cretaceous named after Quetzalcoatl
- Thoth
- Hermes
- Mercury (mythology)
- Ningishzida
