= Chalchiuhtotolin =

Aztec god of disease and plague

- disease and plague.
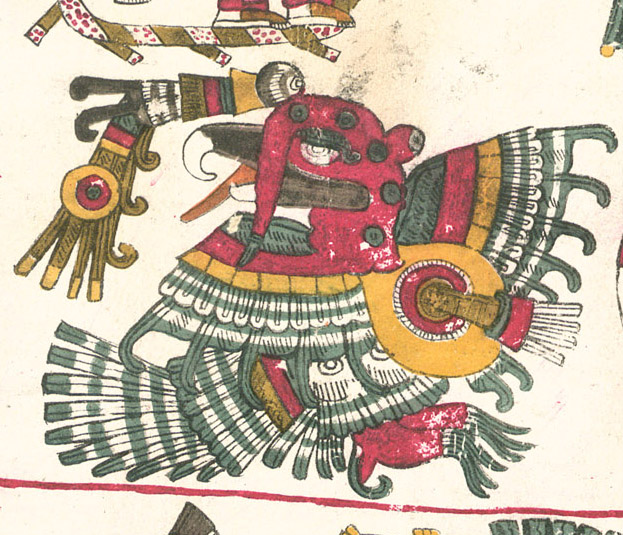
- Codex Borgia
- Gender: male

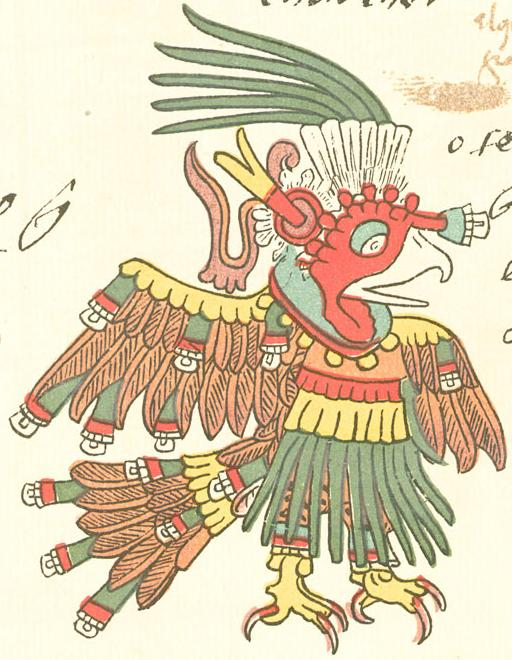
Chalchiuhtotolin, as depicted in the Codex Telleriano-Remensis.

In Aztec mythology, Chalchiuhtotolin (/tʃɑːltʃiːutoʊˈtoʊlin/; Nahuatl for "Jade Turkey") was a god of disease and plague. Chalchihuihtotolin, the Jewelled Fowl, Tezcatlipoca's nahual. Chalchihuihtotolin is a symbol of powerful sorcery. Tezcatlipoca can tempt humans into self-destruction, but when he takes the form of a turkey he can also cleanse them of contamination, absolve them of guilt, and overcome their fate. In the tonalpohualli, Chalchihuihtotolin rules over day Tecpatl (Stone Knife) and over trecena 1-Atl (Water). The preceding thirteen days are ruled over by Xolotl.
