= Tonalamatl =

Aztec divinatory almanac

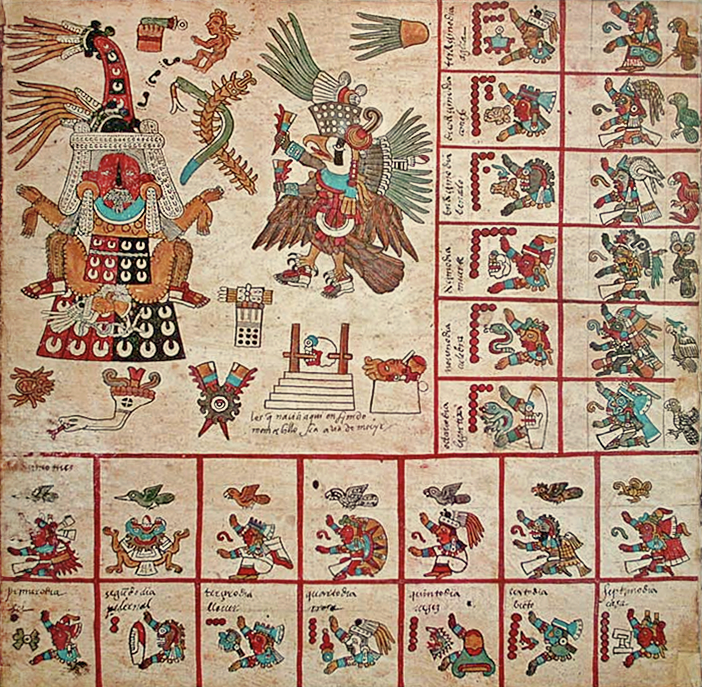
The original page 13 of the Codex Borbonicus, showing the 13th trecena of the Aztec sacred calendar. This 13th trecena was under the auspices of the goddess Tlazolteotl, who is shown on the upper left wearing a flayed skin, giving birth to Cinteotl. The 13 day-signs of this trecena, starting with 1 Earthquake, 2 Flint/Knife, 3 Rain, etc., are shown on the bottom row and the left column.

The tonalamatl [toːnaˈlaːmatɬ] is a divinatory almanac used in central Mexico in the decades, and perhaps centuries, leading up to the Spanish conquest. The word itself is Nahuatl in origin, meaning "pages of days".

The tonalamatl was structured around the sacred 260-day year, the tonalpohualli. This 260-day year consisted of 20 trecena of 13 days each. Each page of a tonalamatl represented one trecena, and was adorned with a painting of that trecena's reigning deity and decorated with the 13 day-signs and 13 other glyphs. These day-signs and glyphs were used to cast horoscopes and discern the future.

The best surviving examples of tonalamatl are the Codex Borbonicus and the Codex Borgia.

== See also ==
- Aztec calendar

== Bibliography ==
- Nowotny, Karl Anton (2005). Tlacuilolli: style and contents of the Mexican pictorial manuscripts with a catalog of the Borgia Group. George A. Everett, Jr. and Edward B. Sisson (trans. and eds.), with a foreword by Ferdinand Anders. Norman: University of Oklahoma Press. ISBN 0-8061-3653-7. OCLC 56527102.
- León-Portilla, Miguel (1963). Aztec Thought and Culture. Jack E. Davis (trans.). Norman: University of Oklahoma Press. ISBN 0-8061-2295-1.
