= Huēhuecoyōtl =

Aztec deity

Huehuecoyotl
- God of the arts, lord of music and ceremonial dance, guide of adulthood and adolescence
- Member of the Nauhtzonteteo
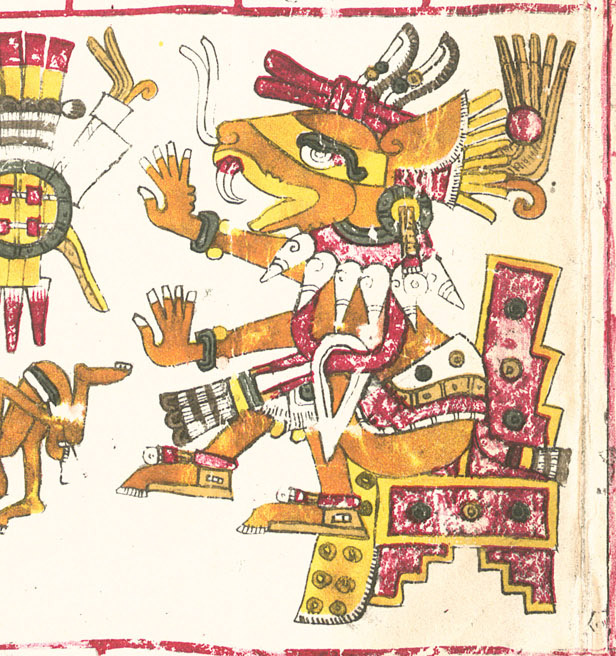
- Huehuecoyotl as depicted in the Codex Borgia
- Other names: Ueuecoyotl
- Abode: Tlalticpac
- Gender: Male
- Region: Mesoamerica
- Ethnic group: Aztec (Nahoa)

Genealogy
- Parents: Omecihuatl (Emerged by Tecpatl)
- Siblings: the Nauhtzonteteo (1,600 gods)
- Consort: None
- Children: None

In Aztec mythology, Huēhuehcoyōtl ([weːweʔˈkojoːt͡ɬ]) (from huēhueh [ˈweːweʔ] "very old" (literally, "old old") and coyōtl [ˈkojoːt͡ɬ] "coyote" in Nahuatl) is the auspicious Pre-Columbian god of music, dance, mischief, and song. He is the patron of uninhibited sexuality — his partners can be female or male of any species — and rules over the day sign in the Aztec calendar named cuetzpallin (lizard) and the fourth trecena Xochitl ("flower" in Nahuatl).

== History ==
Stories derived from the Codex Telleriano-Remensis characterized Huehuecóyotl as a benign prankster, whose tricks were often played on other gods or even humans, but tended to backfire and cause more trouble for himself than for the intended victims. A great party-giver, he also was alleged to create wars among humans to relieve his boredom. He was a part of the Tezcatlipoca (Smoky Mirror) family of the Mexica gods and inherited their shapeshifting powers.

Those who had indications of evil fates from other gods would sometimes appeal to Huehuecóyotl to mitigate or reverse their fates. Huehuecóyotl shares many characteristics with the trickster Coyote of the North American tribes, including storytelling and choral singing. He is also the god of deception.
