= Tōnalpōhualli =

Aztec calendar

Today (at UTC+00)
- Friday, 21 August 2026
- Aztec: Atemoztli 3, 3 Ozomahtli
Other calendars
Armenian	2 Hoṙi 1476
Babylonian	7 Abu, 2337 SE
Balinese pawukon	Menga, Pasah, Sri, Keliwon, Tungleh, Sukra of Medangkungan, Sri, Dangu, Sri
Bengali	6 Bhadro, BS 1433
Chinese	Yin Fire Rabbit・Neck Mansion; 9 Qīyuè, Bǐngwǔnián (Liqiu, 2 days until Chushu)
Common Era	21 August 2026 CE
Coptic	15 Mesori, AM 1742
Egyptian	7 Tybi, NE 2775
Ethiopian	15 Naḥasē, 2018 Amätä Məhrät
French Republican	Décade I, Quartidi de Fructidor de l'Année 234 de la République
Gregorian	21 August, AD 2026
Hebrew	8 Elul, AM 5786
Icelandic	Föstudagur, 27 Heyannir 2026
Islamic	7 Rabi' al-awwal, AH 1448 (tabular method)
ISO week date	2026-W34-5
Japanese	9 Fumizuki, Reiwa 8 (Risshū, 2 days until Shosho)
Julian	8 August, AD 2026 (AM 7534)
Julian day	2461274
Maya	13.0.13.15.11; 4 Mol, 3 Chuen
Roman	ante diem VI Idus Augustas, AUC 2779
Solar Hijri	30 Mordad, SH 1405

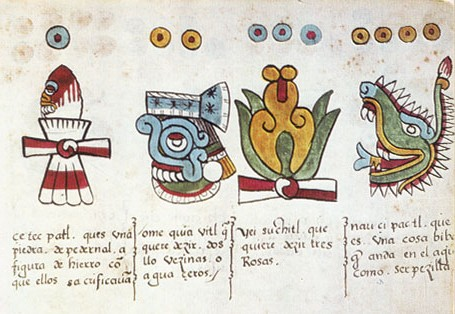
Page 11 reverse from Codex Magliabechiano, showing four day-symbols of the tōnalpōhualli: (ce = one) Flint/Knife tecpatl, (ōme = two) Rain quiahuitl, (ēyi = three) Flower xōchitl, and (nāhui = four) Caiman/Crocodile (cipactli), with Spanish descriptions.

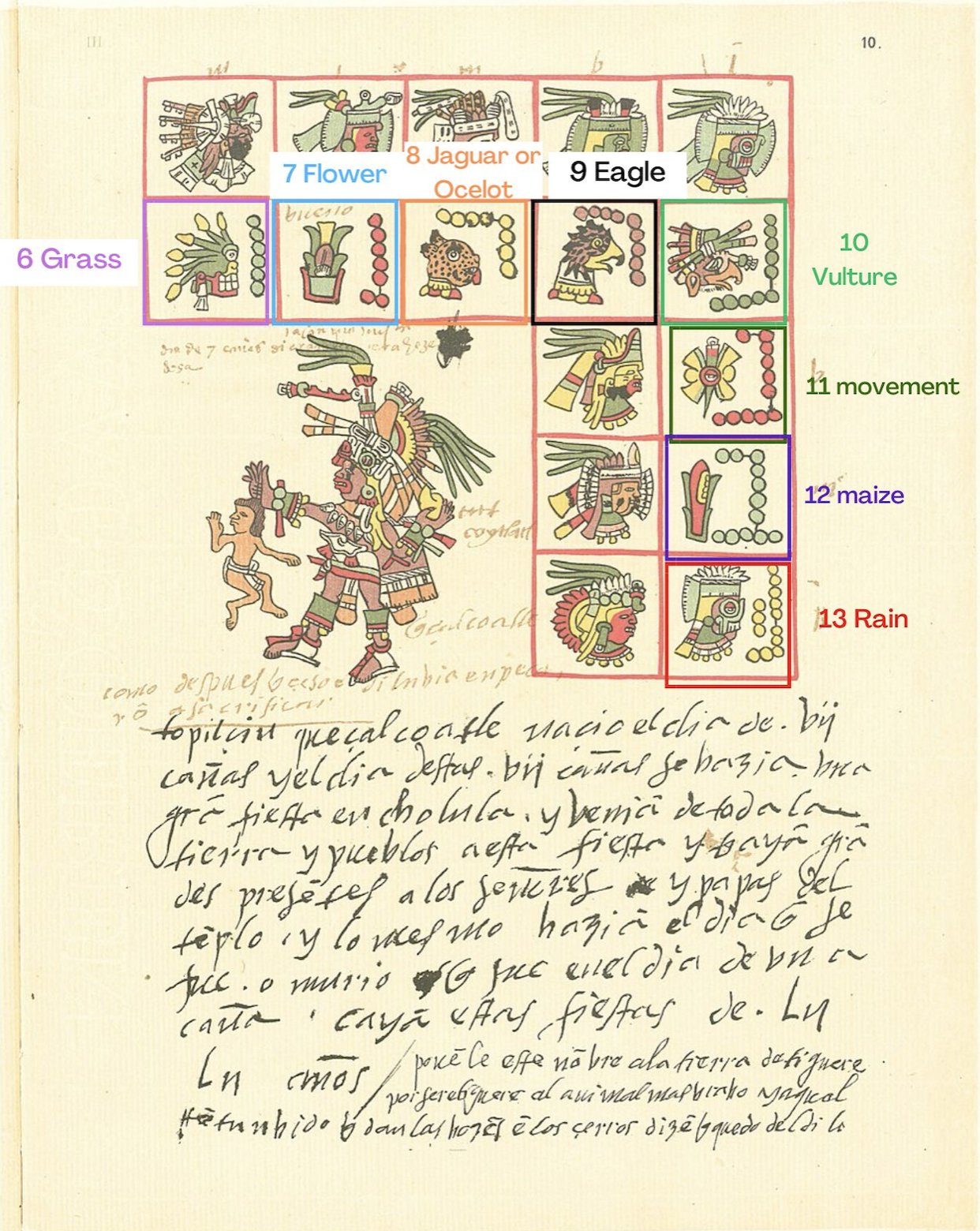
Above is the Codex Telleriano-Remensis: Folio 10r annotated to identify the day signs (Tonalpohualli) and counts on the page. This page includes the later half of a Trecena, starting with 6 grass (6 Malinalli) and ending with 13 rain (13 Quiyahuitl). The Trecena progresses from the second row and the first column and continues to the right. Once it is five columns in the order it progresses downward until the fifth column and fifth row. The Codex Telleriano-Remensis was produced in the sixteenth century with European influence and supplies.

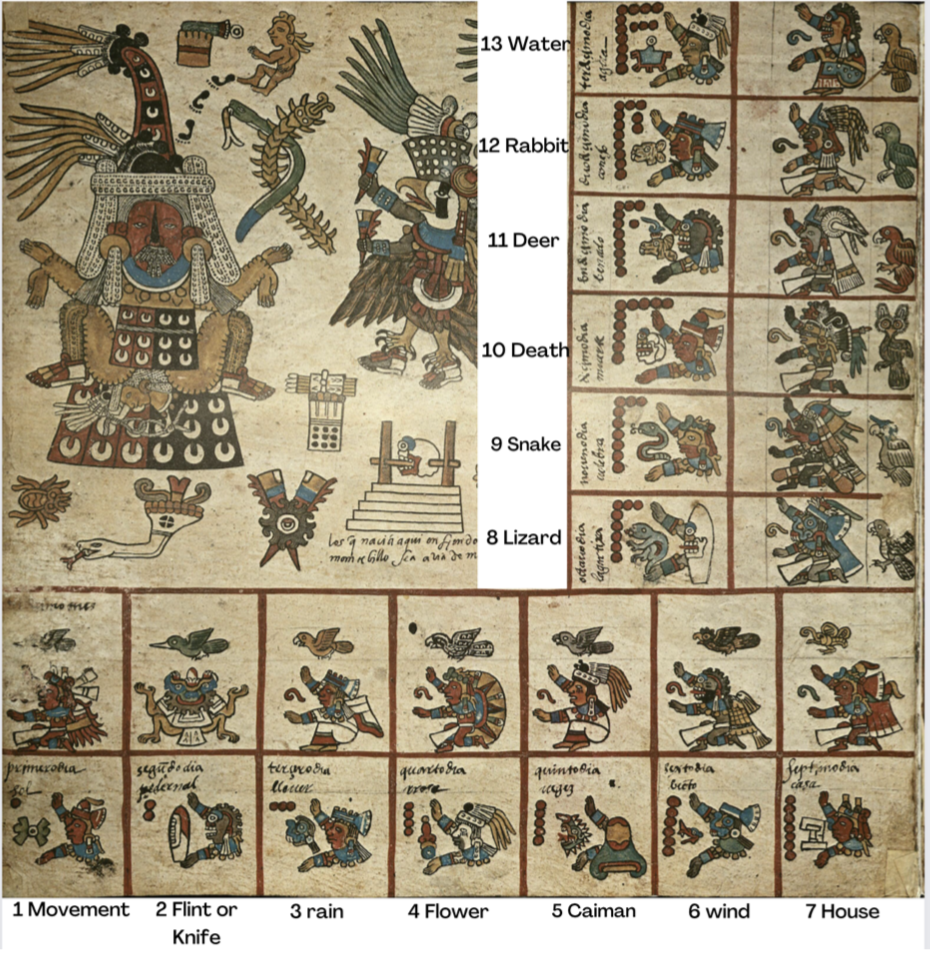
Above is the Codex Borbonicus Folio 13 with annotations to highlight the day signs (Tonalpohualli) within the Trecena which is shown on the page. The Trecena begins at the bottom leftmost corner with 1 movement (1 Olin) and continues through the full 13 day cycle until 13 water (13 Atl) at the top box on the inner column. Each day sign is paired with their respective deity, for example 2 flint is presented by Chalchiuhtotolin.

The tōnalpōhualli (Nahuatl pronunciation: [toːnaɬpoːˈwalːi]), meaning "count of days" in Nahuatl, is a Mexica version of the 260-day calendar in use in pre-Columbian Mesoamerica. This calendar is solar and consists of 20 13-day (trecena) periods. Each trecena is ruled by a different deity. Graphic representations for the twenty day names have existed among certain ethnic, linguistic, or archaeologically identified peoples.

== Description ==
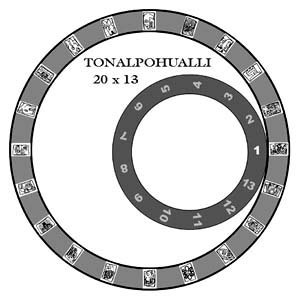
Tonalpōhualli calendar representation

The term for the Aztec day signs, tōnalpōhualli, comes from the root word Tonal which means to give light or heat. A “tonalli” runs from one noon to the next one. Tōnalpōhualli refers to the count of the days, made up of 20 day signs and a 260 day cycle. In Aztec society there were multiple intertwining calendars, the tōnalpōhualli, and the xiuhpōhualli which refers to the solar year of 365 days. The xiuhpōhualli was divided into eighteen twenty day months, and then an extra five days at the end of the cycle. Each day denoted by a different day sign and number, the double calendars were intertwined so that every 52 years the same combination of day signs and numbers would appear again. The full tōnalpōhualli cycle would take place over 260 days and since each day was unique in number and symbol each had its own intrinsic meaning. It is likely that the root of these units comes from the human body: the Aztecs would count using all digits on their body consisting of the 20 day signs. The 260 cycle likely originated from womans’ gestational cycle, as from the time of the first missed menstruation cycle to the time of giving birth is roughly 260 days.

The tōnalpōhualli as aforementioned consists of twenty different day signs or Trecenas, which in almost all representations are accompanied with a glyph depicting its character. The Aztec form of writing is largely pictorial and was a semasiographic system, meaning writing existed separately from spoken word. The glyphs were recognizable to their meaning, and members of the population would understand what day it was and their current position in time. Since the Trecenas would repeat every twenty days they were accompanied by a number from 1 to 13. Usually the day count was depicted by small circles next to the main glyph adding up to the juncture of that day. The glyphs had to be understood by the population so there is a strong level of similarity in depiction of each trecena. However, the day count seems to be up to the discretion of the artist. The first day of the 13-day cycle would be one crocodile (Cipactli) and continue until 13 reeds (Acatl). The next 13-day cycle would begin with one jaguar (Ocelotl) and continue until 13 death (Miquiztli). During this cycle the Trecenas would repeat making the day eight crocodile (Cipactli) and so forth. This pattern would continue until all 20 day signs had been associated with numbers 1 through 13. The Trecenas and numbers were two separate identities, the day five deer (Mazatl) did not represent there being five deer, nor was there any significance to the number five other than as a defining number. The five relates to the juncture of the day, it comes after day 4 and before day 6 in this specific 13-day cycle. The 13-day cycles are subdivisions of the larger 260-day calendar, and they pertain to different rituals and times of the year. The order of the days related to all aspects of life, they dictated when was the right time to plant maize and when to harvest. People felt that they would be vulnerable if the plantings and festivals did not take place on the specified days. The gods were also associated with different days, dictating when to hold a feast in each one's honor and which god to pray to. For example, One reed is associated with Quetzalcoatl, while two reeds are associated with Omacatl. The larger rituals would be on the first half of the 13-day cycles, but other important religious activities were done on specific Tonalpohualli days. For instance, the feast of the sun was held on four movement. Most things in day-to-day life were dependent on the correlating tōnalpōhualli—even given name. When born, formal names would be the day you were born; for example, 5 lizard (Cuetzpalin), and this would determine the child’s destiny. Furthermore, marriages were dependent on the compatibility of the couple’s day signs and numbers.

== Day signs ==
№	Trecena	Glyph	Spirit	Cardinal point
1	1 Cipactli (Caiman or aquatic monster)		Tōnacātēcuhtli	East
2	1 Ehēcatl (Wind)		Quetzalcoatl	North
3	1 Calli (House)		Tepēyōllōtl	West
4	1 Cuetzpalin (Lizard)		Huēhuecoyōtl	South
5	1 Cōātl (Snake)		Chalchiuhtlicue	East
6	1 Miquiztli (Death)		Tecuciztecatl	North
7	1 Mazātl (Deer)		Tlāloc	West
8	1 Tōchtli (Rabbit)		Mayahuel	South
9	1 Ātl (Water)		Xiuhtecuhtli	East
10	1 Itzcuintli (Dog)		Mictlāntēcutli	North
11	1 Ozomahtli (Monkey)		Xochipilli	West
12	1 Malīnalli (Grass)		Patecatl	South
13	1 Ācatl (Reed)		Tezcatlipōca	East
14	1 Ocēlōtl (Ocelot or Jaguar)		Tlazōlteōtl	North
15	1 Cuāuhtli (Eagle)		Xīpe Totēc	West
16	1 Cōzcacuāuhtli (Vulture)		Itzpapalotl	South
17	1 Olīn (Movement or Earthquake)		Xolotl	East
18	1 Tecpatl (Flint or Knife)		Chalchiuhtotolin	North
19	1 Quiyahuitl (Rain)		Tōnatiuh	West
20	1 Xōchitl (Flower)		Xōchiquetzal	South

== Gallery of day signs ==
Note that the symbols are arranged counterclockwise around the calendar stone.

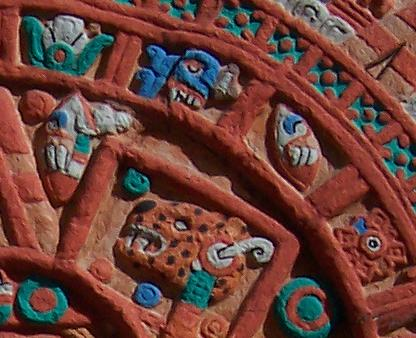
Flower, Rain, Flint, Earthquake

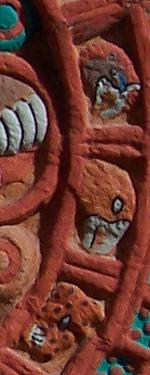
Vulture, Eagle, Jaguar

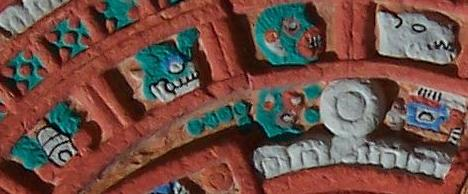
Reed, Grass, Monkey, Dog

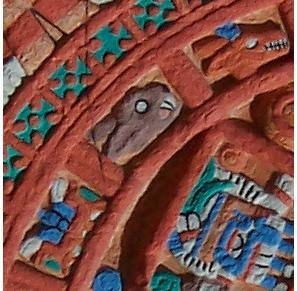
Water, Rabbit, Deer

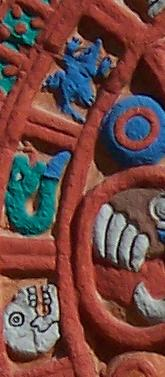
Death, Snake, Lizard

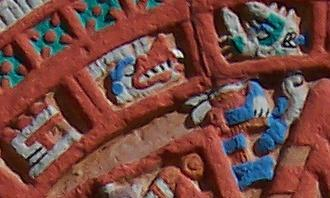
House, Wind, Alligator

== See also ==
- Aztec calendar
- Aztec calendar stone
- Aztec mythology
- Maya calendar
- Tzolkʼin
