= Xipe Totec =

Central deity in Aztec religion

Xipe-Totec
- God of ritual flaying and agriculture, lord of seasons, regeneration and crafts, patron of goldsmiths. Ruler of the East
- Member of the Tezcatlipocas
- Xipe Totec as depicted in the Codex Borgia
- Other names: Red Tezcatlipoca, Camaxtli, Camaxtle, Xipe
- Abode: • Ilhuicatl-Teteocan (Twelfth Heaven) • the East
- Symbol: Quail
- Gender: Male
- Region: Mesoamerica
- Ethnic group: Aztec (Nahua)
- Festivals: Tlacaxipehualiztli

Genealogy
- Parents: Ometecuhtli and Omecihuatl (Codex Zumarraga)
- Siblings: Quetzalcoatl, Tezcatlipoca, Huitzilopochtli (Codex Zumarraga)
- Children: None

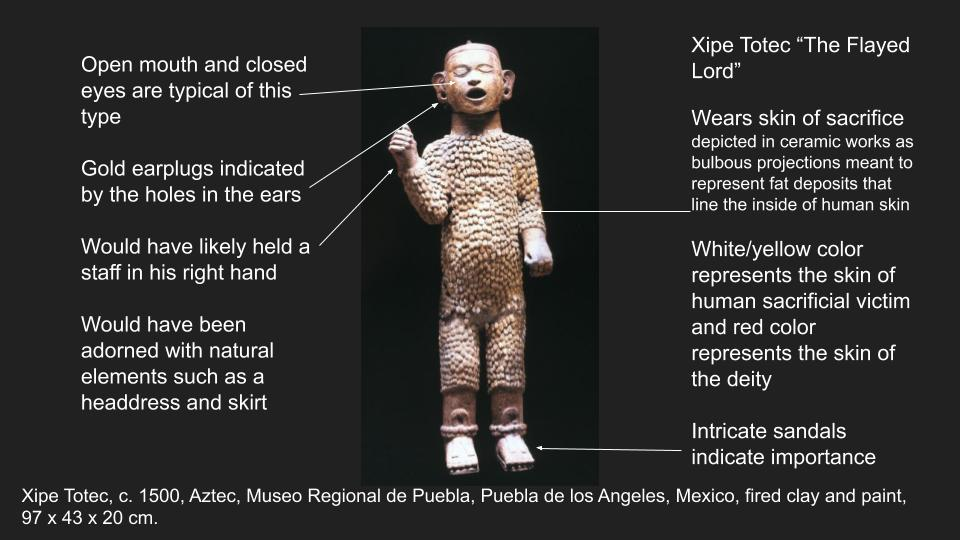
Annotated image of Xipe Totec sculpture

In Aztec mythology, Xipe Totec (/ˈʃiːpeɪ ˈtoʊtɛk/ SHEE-pay TOH-tek; Classical Nahuatl: Xīpe Totēc [ˈʃiːpe ˈtoteːk(ʷ)]) or Xipetotec ("Our Lord the Flayed One") was a life-death-rebirth deity, god of agriculture, vegetation, the east, spring, goldsmiths, silversmiths, liberation, deadly warfare, the seasons, and the earth. The female equivalent of Xipe Totec was the goddess Xilonen-Chicomecoatl.

Xipe Totec connected agricultural renewal with warfare. He flayed himself to give food to humanity, symbolic of the way maize seeds lose their outer layer before germination and of snakes shedding their skin. He is often depicted as being red beneath the flayed skin he wears, likely referencing his own flayed nature. Xipe Totec was believed by the Aztecs to be the god that invented war. His insignia included the pointed cap and rattle staff, which was the war attire for the Mexica emperor. He had a temple called Yopico within the Great Temple of Tenochtitlan. Xipe Totec is associated with pimples, inflammation and eye diseases, and possibly plague. Xipe Totec has a strong relation to diseases such as smallpox, blisters and eye sickness and if someone suffered from these diseases offerings were made to him.

This deity is of uncertain origin. Xipe Totec was widely worshipped in central Mexico at the time of the Spanish Conquest, and was known throughout most of Mesoamerica. Representations of the god have been found as far away as Tazumal in El Salvador. The worship of Xipe Totec was common along the Gulf Coast during the Early Postclassic. The deity probably became an important Aztec god as a result of the Aztec conquest of the Gulf Coast in the middle of the fifteenth century.

In January 2019, Mexican archaeologists from the National Institute of Anthropology and History confirmed that they had discovered the first known surviving temple dedicated to Xipe Totec in the state of Puebla. The temple was found while examining ruins of the Popoluca peoples indigenous to Mexico. The Popolucas built the temple in an area called Ndachjian-Tehuacan between AD 1000 and 1260 prior to Aztec invasion of the area.

== Etymology ==
The name Xipe Totec or Xipetotec consists of two elements: xīpe "flayed" and totēc, the first-person plural possessive form of tēuctli "lord". Thus, it could be interpreted as meaning "Our Lord the Flayed One". He was also known by various other names, including Tlatlauhca (Nahuatl pronunciation: [t͡ɬaˈt͡ɬawka]), Tlatlauhqui Tezcatlipoca (Nahuatl pronunciation: [t͡ɬaˈt͡ɬawki teskat͡ɬiˈpoːka]) ("Red Smoking Mirror") and Yohuallahuan (Nahuatl pronunciation: [jowallawan]) ("the Night Drinker"), and Yaotzin ("revered enemy"). The Tlaxcaltecs and the Huexotzincas worshipped a version of the deity under the name of Camaxtli, and the god has been identified with Yopi, a Zapotec god represented on Classic Period urns.

Originally the name of the first son of the creative couple Ometecuhtli and Omecihuatl is Tlatlauhca or Tlatlauhaqui Tezcatlipoca, "Smoking red mirror." Of obscure origin, this god is honored by the Tlaxcalans and Huejocinas with the name of Camaxtli, and apparently a deity of Zapotlan, Xalisco, is widely known in almost all of Mesoamerica with the name of Xipetotec, 'Our Lord Flayed'. His body is dyed yellow on one side and lined on the other, his face is carved, superficially divided into two parts by a narrow strip that runs from the forehead to the jawbone. His head wears a kind of hood of different colors with tassels that hang down his back. The Tlaxcala myth that refers to Camaxtle, a god identified as Xipe-Totec himself

Camaxtle begins a war against the Shires and defeats them. The war lasts until 1 acatl, when Camaxtle is defeated, after this failure he meets one of the women created by Yayauhqui Tezcatlipoca, called Chimalma, and with her he conceives five children, one of whom is Ce Acatl Topiltzin Quetzalcoatl, who governs Tula (Another myth says that it is Yayauhqui Tezcatlipoca, the enemy who in his invocation of Mixcoatl impregnates Chimalma)

It is difficult to discern if Camaxtle is the same Tlatlauhqui Tezcatlipoca-Xipetotec or Yayauhqui Tezcatlipoca who changes his name to Mixcoatl; or Huitzilopochtli himself as identified by some informants and authors. The truth is that he is related to fire and hunting. After the destruction of the earth by water, came chaos. Everything was desolation. Humanity had died and the heavens were over the Earth. When the gods saw that the heavens had fallen, they resolved to reach the center of the Earth, opening four subterranean paths for this, and to enter these paths to lift them up. To reward such a great action, Tonacacihuatl and Tonacatecuhtli made their children the lords of the heavens and the stars, and the path that Tezcatlipoca and Quetzalcoatl traveled was marked by the Milky Way. And this great nebula was also called Mixcoatl or Iztac-Mixcoatl, 'white cloud snake'

Jerónimo de Mendieta determines that Iztac-Mixcoatl is the personification of the Milky Way, the inhabitant of Chicomoztoc that the Nahuas call ‘White Cloud Serpent’, since such is the shape of the great nebula in the sky. And Ilancueye is nothing more than the personification of the Earth.

== Attributes ==
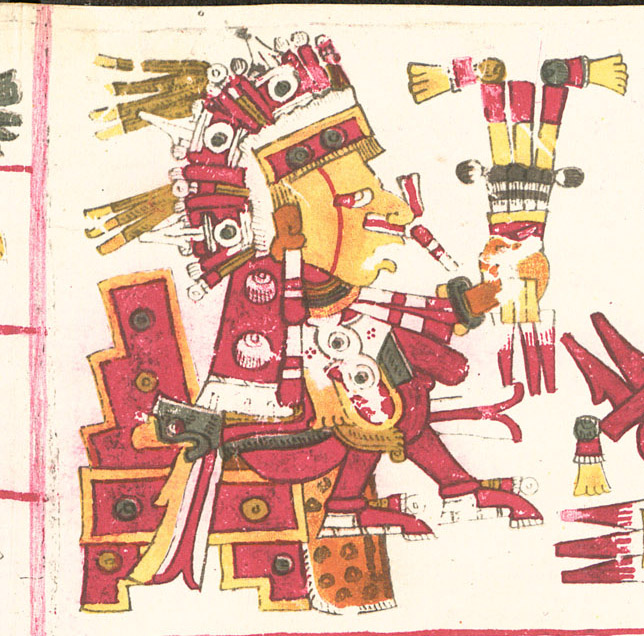
Xipe Totec as depicted in the Codex Borgia

Xipe Totec appears in codices with his right hand upraised and his left hand extending towards the front. Xipe Totec is represented wearing flayed human skin, usually with the flayed skin of the hands falling loose from the wrists. His hands are bent in a position that appears to possibly hold a ceremonial object. His body is often painted yellow on one side and tan on the other. His mouth, lips, neck, hands and legs are sometimes painted red. In some cases, some parts of the human skin covering is painted yellowish-gray. The eyes are not visible, the mouth is open and the ears are perforated. He frequently had vertical stripes running down from his forehead to his chin, running across the eyes. He was sometimes depicted with a yellow shield and carrying a container filled with seeds. One Xipe Totec sculpture was carved from volcanic rock, and portrays a man standing on a small pedestal. The chest has an incision, made in order to extract the heart of the victim before flaying. It is likely that sculptures of Xipe Totec were ritually dressed in the flayed skin of sacrificial victims and wore sandals. In most of Xipe Totec sculptures, artists make emphasis in his sacrificial and renewal nature by portraying the different layers of skin.

== Symbolism ==
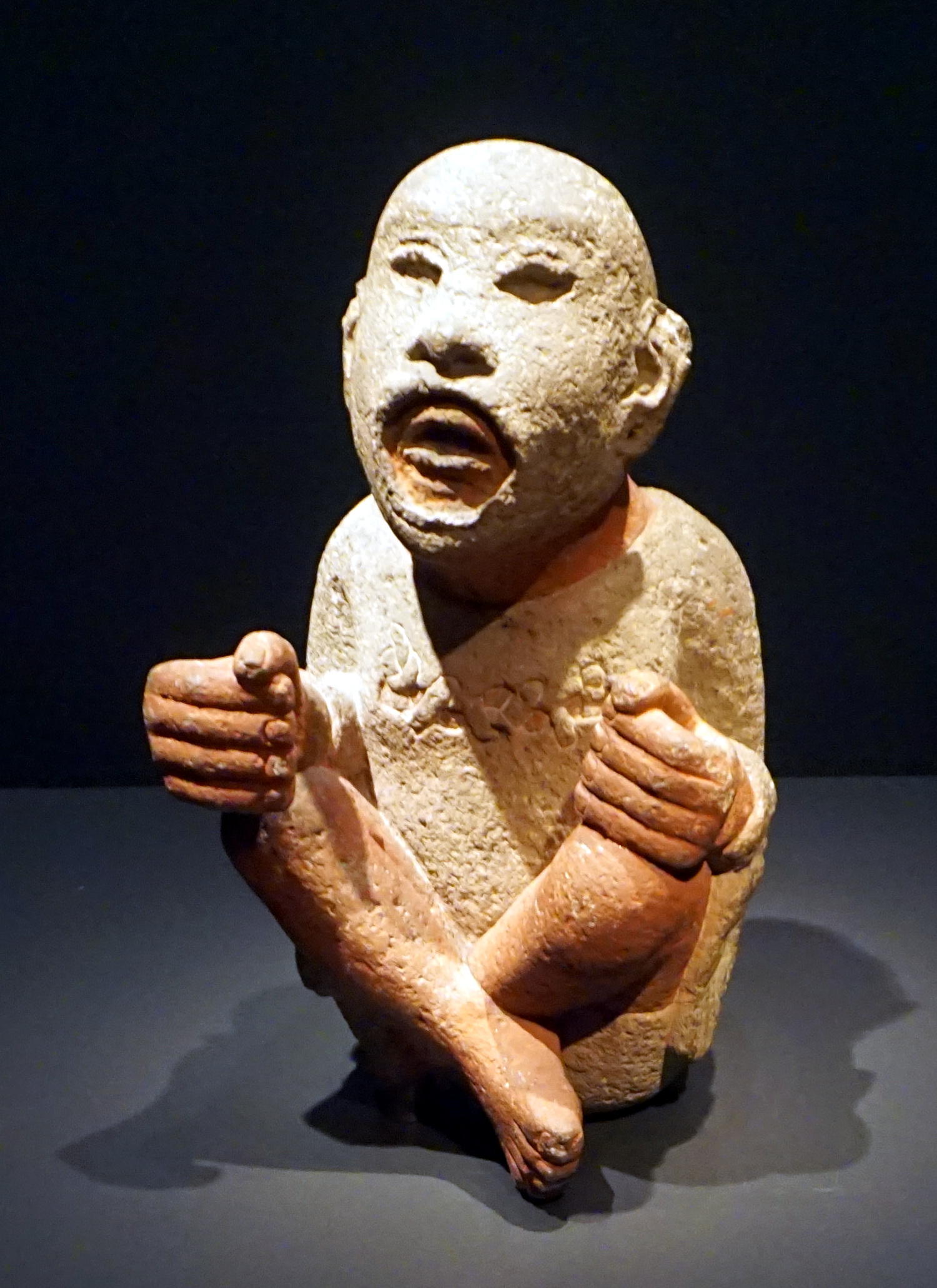
Xipe Totec, shown wearing the flayed skin of a sacrificial victim

Xipe Totec emerging from rotting, flayed skin after twenty days symbolised rebirth and the renewal of the seasons, the casting off of the old and the growth of new vegetation. New vegetation was represented by putting on the new skin of a flayed captive because it symbolized the vegetation the earth puts on when the rain comes. The living god lay concealed underneath the superficial veneer of death, ready to burst forth like a germinating seed. The deity also had a malevolent side as Xipe Totec was said to cause rashes, pimples, inflammations and eye infections.

The flayed skins were believed to have curative properties when touched and mothers took their children to touch such skins in order to relieve their ailments. People wishing to be cured made offerings to him at Yopico.

== Annual festival ==
The annual festival of Xipe Totec was celebrated on the spring equinox before the onset of the rainy season; it was known as Tlacaxipehualiztli ([t͡ɬakaʃipewaˈlist͡ɬi]; lit. "flaying of men"). This festival took place in March at the time of the Spanish Conquest. Forty days before the festival of Xipe Totec, a slave who was captured at war was dressed to represent the living god who was honored during this period. This occurred in every ward of the city, which resulted in multiple slaves being selected. The central ritual act of "Tlacaxipehualiztli" was the gladiatorial sacrifice of war prisoners, which both began and culminated the festival. On the next day of the festival, the game of canes was performed in the manner of two bands. The first band were those who took the part of Xipe Totec and went dressed in the skins of the war prisoners who were killed the previous day, so the fresh blood was still flowing. The opposing band was composed of daring soldiers who were brave and fearless, and who took part in the combat with the others. After the conclusion of this game, those who wore the human skins went around throughout the whole town, entering houses and demanding that those in the houses give them some alms or gifts for the love of Xipe Totec. While in the houses, they sat down on sheaves of tzapote leaves and put on necklaces which were made of ears of corn and flowers. They had them put on garlands and give them pulque to drink, which was their wine. Annually, slaves or captives were selected as sacrifices to Xipe Totec. After having the heart cut out, the body was carefully flayed to produce a nearly whole skin which was then worn by the priests for twenty days during the fertility rituals that followed the sacrifice. This act of putting on new skin was a ceremony called 'Neteotquiliztli' translating to "impersonation of a god". The skins were often adorned with bright feathers and gold jewellery when worn. During the festival, victorious warriors wearing flayed skins carried out mock skirmishes throughout Tenochtitlan, they passed through the city begging alms and blessed whoever gave them food or other offerings. When the twenty-day festival was over, the flayed skins were removed and stored in special containers with tight-fitting lids designed to stop the stench of putrefaction from escaping. These containers were then stored in a chamber beneath the temple.

The goldsmiths also participated in Tlacaxipehualizti. They had a feast called Yopico every year in the temple during the month of Tlacaxipehualizti. A satrap was adorned in the skin taken from one of the captives in order to appear like Xipe Totec. On the dress, they put a crown made of rich feathers, which was also a wig of false hair. Gold ornaments were put in the nose and nasal septum. Rattles were put in the right hand and a gold shield was put in the left hand, while red sandals were put on their feet decorated with quail-feathers. They also wore skirts made of rich feathers and a wide gold necklace. They were seated and offered Xipe Totec an uncooked tart of ground maize, many ears of corn that had been broken apart in order to get to the seeds, along with fruits and flowers. The deity was honored with a dance and ended in a war exercise.

== Human sacrifice ==
Various methods of human sacrifice were used to honour this god. The flayed skins were often taken from sacrificial victims who had their hearts cut out, and some representations of Xipe Totec show a stitched-up wound in the chest.

"Gladiator sacrifice" is the name given to the form of sacrifice in which an especially courageous war captive was given mock weapons, tied to a large circular stone and forced to fight against a fully armed Aztec warrior. As a weapon he was given a macuahuitl (a wooden sword with blades formed from obsidian) with the obsidian blades replaced with feathers. A white cord was tied either around his waist or his ankle, binding him to the sacred temalacatl stone. At the end of the Tlacaxipehualiztli festival, gladiator sacrifice (known as tlauauaniliztli) was carried out by five Aztec warriors: two jaguar warriors, two eagle warriors and a fifth, left-handed warrior.

"Arrow sacrifice" was another method used by the worshippers of Xipe Totec. The sacrificial victim was bound spread-eagled to a wooden frame, he was then shot with many arrows so that his blood spilled onto the ground. The spilling of the victim's blood to the ground was symbolic of the desired abundant rainfall, with a hopeful result of plentiful crops. After the victim was shot with the arrows, the heart was removed with a stone knife. The flayer then made a laceration from the lower head to the heels and removed the skin in one piece. These ceremonies went on for twenty days; meanwhile the votaries of the god wore the skins.

Another instance of sacrifice was done by a group of metalworkers who were located in the town of Azcapotzalco, who held Xipe Totec in special veneration. Xipe was a patron to all metalworkers (teocuitlapizque), but he was particularly associated with the goldsmiths. Among this group, those who stole gold or silver were sacrificed to Xipe Totec. Before this sacrifice, the victims were taken through the streets as a warning to others.

Other forms of sacrifice were sometimes used; at times the victim was cast into a firepit and burned; others had their throats cut.

== See also ==
- Human sacrifice in Aztec culture
- Aztec mythology
- Itztapaltotec
