= H. B. Nicholson =

- Born: September 5, 1925; La Jolla, San Diego, California
- Died: March 2, 2007 (aged 81); Redondo Beach, California
- Citizenship: United States
- Education: University of California, Berkeley (BA); Harvard University (PhD)
- Scientific career
- Fields: The Aztecs and prehispanic Mesoamerica generally
- Workplaces: UCLA

Henry Bigger Nicholson (September 5, 1925 – March 2, 2007) who published under the name H.B. Nicholson, was a scholar of the Aztecs. He was a professor at UCLA in the Department of Anthropology where he taught courses in Ethnohistory, Aztec Archaeology, and Maya Archaeology. His major scholarly monograph is Topiltzin Quetzalcoatl: The Once and Future Lord of the Toltecs (2001).

Nicholson died of a heart attack on March 2, 2007.

== Publications ==
=== Monograph ===
- Topiltzin Quetzalcoatl: The Once and Future Lord of the Toltecs Boulder: University Press of Colorado 2001

=== Articles and encyclopedia entries ===
- Two Aztec Wood Idols: Iconographic and Chronologic Analysis (with Rainer Berger; 1968)
- "Religion in Pre-Hispanic Central Mexico" In Handbook of Middle American Indians, vol. 10, 395–446, Eds. G. F. Ekholm and Ignacio Bernal, Austin, university oí Texas Press.
- "Eduard Georg Seler, 1849-1922," Handbook of Middle American Indians(HMAI) Guide to Ethnohistorical Sources, Vol. 13 Part 2. (1973) pp. 348–369.
- "Sahagún’s Primeros Memoriales, Tepepulco", HMAI vol. 13 pp. 207–217.
- "Middle American Ethnohistory: An Overview," HMAI, vol. 15 pp. 487–505.
- Origins of Religious Art & Iconography in Preclassic Mesoamerica (as editor; 1976)
- Pre-Columbian Art from the Land Collection (with Alana Cordy-Collins; 1979)
- Art of Aztec Mexico: Treasures of Tenochtitlan (with Eloise Quiñones Keber; 1983)
- Mixteca-Puebla: Discoveries and Research in Mesoamerican Art and Archaeology (edited with Eloise Quiñones Keber; 1994)
- "Borgia Group of Pictorial Manuscripts" in Oxford Encyclopedia of Mesoamerican Cultures (OEMC), New York: Oxford University Press 2001, vol. 1, pp. 98–101.
- "Feathered Serpent" OEMC, vol. 1, pp. 397–400.
- "Mixteca-Puebla Style" OEMC, vol. 2, pp. 329–330.
- "Bernardino de Sahagún" OEMC, vol. 3, pp. 105–113.
- "Eduard Seler" OEMC, vol. 3, pp. 134–37.
- "Topiltzin Quetzalcoatl" OEMC vol. 3, 246–247.
