= Lords of the Night =

Set of nine gods in Mesoamerican mythology

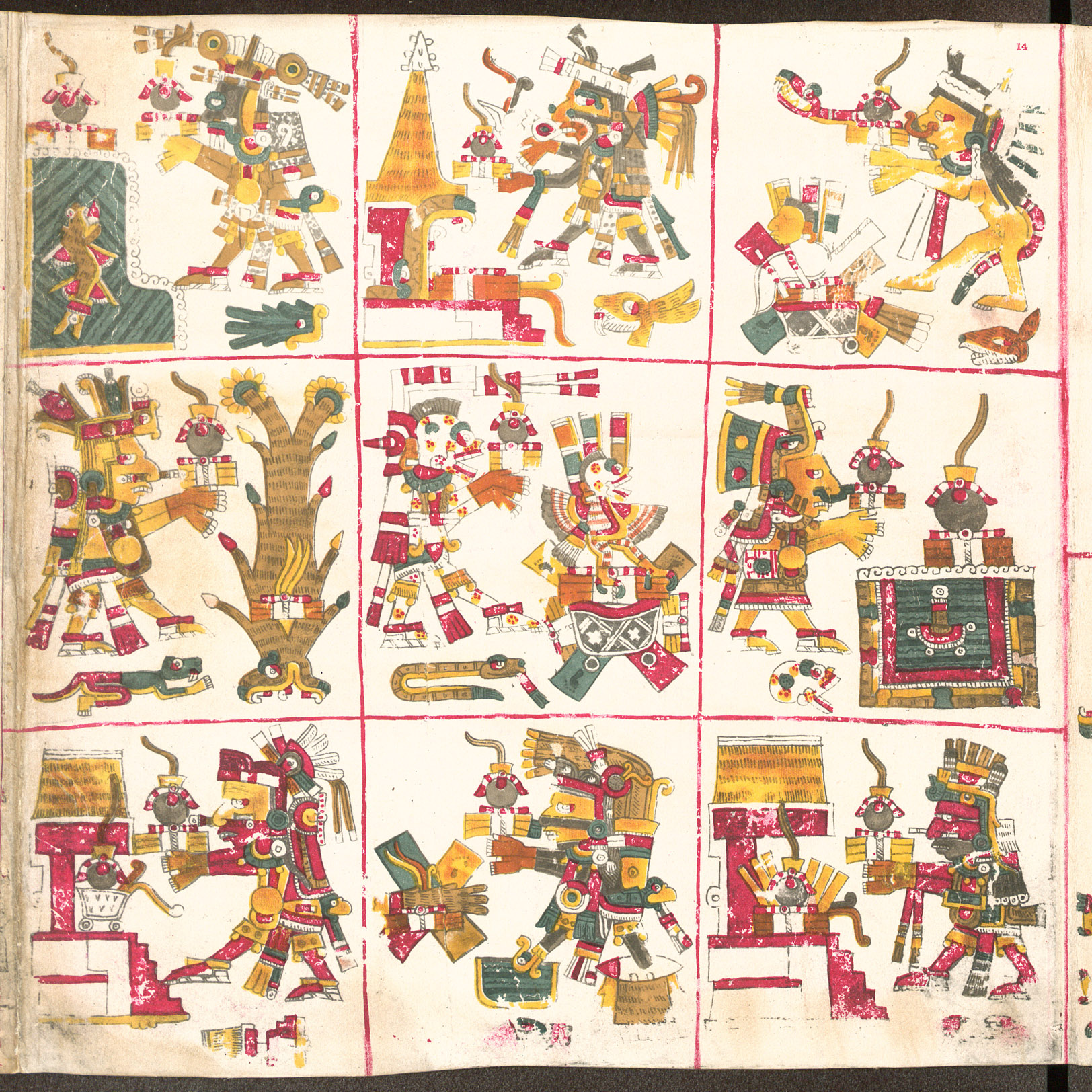
Lords of the Night in Codex Borgia (1a) Tlaloc, (1b) Tepeyollotl, (1c) Tlazolteotl, (2a) Centeotl, (2b) Mictlantecuhtli, (2c) Chalchiuhtlicue, (3a) Piltzintecuhtli, (3b) Tezcatlipoca, (3c) Xiuhtecuhtli. The actual reading order of the panels is boustrophedon and begins in the bottom right: 3c, 3b, 3a, 2a, 2b, 2c, 1c, 1b, 1a.

In Mesoamerican mythology the Lords of the Night (Classical Nahuatl: Yohualtecuhtin) are a set of nine deities who each ruled over every ninth night forming a calendrical cycle. Each lord was associated with a particular fortune, bad or good, that was an omen for the night that they ruled over.

The lords of the night are known in both the Nahua and Maya calendar, although the specific names of the Maya Night Lords are unknown.

The glyphs corresponding to the night gods are known and Mayanists identify them with labels G1 to G9, the G series. Generally, these glyphs are frequently used with a fixed glyph coined F. The only Mayan light lord that has been identified is the God G9, Pauahtun the Aged Quadripartite God.

The existence of a 9 nights cycle in Mesoamerican calendrics was first discovered in 1904 for the European academic theater by Eduard Seler. The Nahua names of the Deities are known because their names are glossed in the Codex Telleriano-Remensis and Codex Tudela. Seler argued that the 9 lords each corresponded to one of the nine levels of the underworld and ruled the corresponding hour of the nighttime; this argument has not generally been accepted, since the evidence suggests that the lord of a given night ruled over that entire night. Zelia Nuttall argued that the Nine Lords of the Night represented the nine moons of the Lunar year. The cycle of the Nine Lords of the Night held special relation to the Mesoamerican ritual calendar of 260-days and nights which includes almost exactly 29 groups of 9 nights each, and conversely 9 vague lunations of 29 days each.

The Nine Lords of the Night in Aztec mythology are:

Xiuhtecuhtli ("Turquoise Lord/Lord of Fire")
Tezcatlipoca ("Smoking Mirror")
Piltzintecuhtli ("Noble Lord")
Centeotl ("Maize God")
Mictlantecuhtli ("Underworld Lord")
Chalchiuhtlicue ("Jade Is Her Skirt")
Tlazolteotl ("Filth God[dess]")
Tepeyollotl ("Heart of the Mountains")
Tlaloc ("Rain")
