= Ochpaniztli =

Eleventh month of the Aztec calendar

Ochpaniztli is the Eleventh Month of the Aztec calendar. It is also a festival in the Aztec religion dedicated to Toci and Tlazolteotl and is also the month of cleaning or sweeping away. It could also be referred to as Tenahuatiliztli ("summons").

== Meaning ==
Ochpaniztli was largely concerned with sweeping, which was a reference to the rush of winds that occurred in the valley of Mexico before the winter rains came, the end of the growing season and the start of the harvesting season. The Belgian historian Michel Graulich argued that the Mexica calendar was defective, and that Ochpaniztli, which means the "Sweeping of the Roads" in Nāhuatl was being celebrated at the wrong time of the year. The Mexica had originated somewhere considerably to the north of the valley of Mexico in a place they called Aztlán. Graulich argued that the calendar had been devised for their more temperate climate of their homeland and did not make allowances for the tropical weather in the valley of Mexico.

The harvesting season of war was when the Mexica (better known as the Aztecs) went to war for captives to sacrifice to the gods, who could never have enough human flesh to eat. Toci, "Our Grandmother", was one of the Mexica deities, who may have once been a gentle young Culhua princess promised in marriage to a Mexica prince. However, the chief Mexica god Huītzilōpōchtli intervened, and at the wedding, the princess was instead flayed alive and killed on Huītzilōpōchtli's orders. Upon her death, Toci transformed into a deity, becoming the wrathful and cruel goddess of war who promptly celebrated her apotheosis by marrying Huītzilōpōchtli. Even though it was Huītzilōpōchtli who was responsible for her being skinned alive, Toci's rage over her flaying was not directed at him, but instead left her with a savage, misanthropic hatred of all humanity.

== Rituals ==
=== The beginning ===
For the first five days of Ochpaniztli, the emphasis was on silence and quiet in the Mexica capital of Tenochtitlan (modern Mexico City). To celebrate Ochpaniztli all of the buildings in Tenochtitlan were cleared to make the city ritually pure for the holiday. On the fifth day, all of the fires in Tenochtitlan were extinguished. On the sixth day and continuing for eight more, warriors would march through the streets of Tenochtitlan carrying flowering branches until dusk. The warriors maintained tight discipline as they circled in elaborate maneuvers carrying marigolds and in complete silence except for the beating of the drums.

After eight days, the women of the doctor's guild and the midwives guild, all wearing the tobacco pouch that showed their membership in the guilds, would come out to engage in mock battles on the streets of Tenochtitlan. The women attacked each other in mock combat with the branches and flowers rolled into balls dropped by the warriors, before sweeping the streets so that the woman dressed as Toci, "Our Grandmother", would be paraded through the streets. Toci, the "Woman of Discord" in Mexica religion, loved the carnage and bloody mayhem of war, and it was to honor her that Ochpanitztli marked the beginning of the season of war.

To honor Toci, a young female slave was chosen to be the ixiptla (proxy) for Toci, being kept in a cage and being especially cleaned every day to prepare her for her sacrifice for Toci. The slave chosen to be sacrificed was selected by the women of the midwives and healers' guilds. It was very important that the woman chosen to die for Toci be ritually pure for her sacrifice, being guarded by other women who kept her in a cage both to prevent her escape and to ensure that she did not have sex for the twenty days prior to her death, making her a "pure" victim. The mock battles between the women as they pelted each other with balls of cactus leaves, moss, marigolds and reeds was to make the ixipta laugh, because the young woman chosen to die was never allowed to cry. The climax of the festival of Ochpaniztli was the sacrifice of a young woman from one of the peoples subjected to the power of the Mexica, who for four days was bedecked with flowers and perfume and was teased by the woman taking care of her about her impending doom. The woman was dressed as Toci and had black make-up applied around her mouth while the rest of her face was covered in white make-up, thereby making her resemble Toci whose face was a deathly shade of white except for the area around her mouth where her skin was black. One of Toci's favorite foods besides human flesh was human excrement, and this coprophagic diet had turned the skin around her mouth permanently black.

The woman chosen as the sacrificial victim was forced to smile at all times and was severely beaten by the other women guarding her if she cried, because it was felt that her tears would spoil the ceremony as it was believed that every tear would cause a stillbirth or the death of a warrior in battle in the next year. By contrast, the rain god Tlaloc required the sacrifice of children to honor him, and it was believed that the tears of the doomed children would ensure rain in the coming year, so the Mexica went to great lengths to have the children destined to die for Tlaloc to cry as much as possible before their hearts were ripped out.

=== The sacrifice ===
The Australian historian Inga Clendinnen wrote that the young woman chosen as the sacrificial victim must have been in a state close to "hysteria", as she knew when the night came on the fifth day, she would die while being forced to smile all the time at the prospect of her demise. On the fifth day to honor Toci, the young woman was marched through the streets of Tenochtitlan surrounded by other women, spreading maize and flowers before being taken in the evening to the temple of the Maize Lord. Joining the woman chosen to die on her last day were men dressed in the style of the Huaxteca people living on the Gulf coast, whom the Mexica despised as cowardly warriors, but who were widely admired as the Huaxteca men were reputably the most well endowed men in Mexico and were famed as great lovers. The young woman wore a dress of maguey fiber, which she herself had woven and which she sold on the last day of her life in the marketplace. To calm the girl down, she was told by the other women that she would not be sacrificed, but instead would have sex with the Tlatoani (emperor) in public on top of the pyramid.

At the pyramid, she was laid on a slab facing the sky, had her mouth bound so she could not scream and she was sacrificed by having her head slowly sawed off by using an obsidian knife as she was laid there bound, staring upwards at the stars, so the crops might grow in the next season. The sacrifice of the women recalled the story about how Toci came to be, when Actitometl, the leader of the Culhua people, had given his daughter in marriage to the Mexica leader, who promptly sacrificed her to Huitzilopochtli, the god of war, becoming Toci at the moment of her death.

Clendinnen described what happened next:

"Then, still in darkness, silence, and urgent haste, her body was flayed, and a naked priest, a 'very strong man, very powerful, very tall', struggled into the wet skin, with its slack breasts and pouched genitalia: a double nakedness of layered, ambiguous sexuality. The skin of one thigh was reserved to be fashioned into a face-mask for the man impersonating Centeotl, Young Lord Maize Cob, the son of Toci".

At that point, the priest wearing the bloody skin of the victim become Toci, and was seen as a "woman", always being addressed as she and her. This man seen as "Toci" was followed by four barely dressed, well endowed young men wearing tight loincloths so that their erect penises would be all too visible while wearing cotton blossoms and carrying spindles, symbols of femininity in Mexica culture, which were meant to emphasize the ambiguous sexuality of the gods who could be either male, female or change sex as the circumstances required. Xilonen, the goddess of maize, changed sex over the course of the growing season, turning into Centeotl, the Maize Lord. Maize in its early stages was slender with long hair and had milky kernels whose shapes reminded the Mexica of breasts, all suggestive of a woman's body, while maize in its later stages is hard, erect, and phallic shaped. The Mexica saw the change in the shape of maize as due to Xilonen, the Maize Lady becoming Centeotl, the Maize Lord. As the maize was harvested, Centeotl was "castrated" by the cutting off of the phallic maize, causing him to turn back into the maiden Xilonen.

The tearing apart of the body of the young woman chosen as the sacrifice victim served as a reenactment of the creation of the earth. The sacrifice victim symbolized Tlalteotl, the earth goddess. The tearing apart of her body was recreation of the tearing apart of the body of Tlalteotl. In much the same way that the dismemberment of Tlalteotl was necessary for plants to live on the earth, so too was the tearing apart of the body of a young woman for a good harvest. Graulich wrote: "Her ritual killing was like a wedding; the impersonator was killed and skinned alive, and a new vigorous impersonator played her part, mimicking the hierogamy of heaven and earth, and the delivery of maize."

=== The climax ===
Clendinnen described pictures of the four young men standing beside the priest dressed in the bloody skin representing Toci as wearing Huaxteca hats (the Huaxteca were legendary in Mexico for their erotic skills) as having "glorious erections", evoking a very masculine and sexualized imaginary despite being dressed in mostly feminine style. At the foot of the pyramid, the chief priest and warriors greeted "Toci" and "her" four young men, and would flee in mock terror as "Toci" and company would sweep the streets on their way to the Great Pyramid. The mock-terror of the warriors was all the more remarkable as a popular Mexica poem had boasted that "Here no one fears to die in war" as the aggressively militaristic Mexica loathed cowardice and to die in battle was the highest honor for a man, which indicated the fear the Mexica had for "Our Grandmother". Along the way to the Great Pyramid, poles were erected which prisoners of the Mexica were forced to climb, only to be knocked down. The poles symbolized trees while the prisoners being knocked down symbolized fruit. The priest would lick the blood from the prisoners playing the fruit and then give what was described as an "eerie" cry, which symbolized how the blood had given "her" the strength for sex and pregnancy. At the Great Pyramid, "Toci" together with the man wearing the mask made of human skin playing the Maize Lord, were taken to the top of the Great Pyramid to sit on "her" throne with "her son" sitting next to her, where in the morning they greeted the priests as they arrived at the Great Pyramid.

To honor "her" arrival, a number of prisoners of war were crucified at the foot of the temple and were killed by warriors shooting arrows at them. Blood from the victims was collected in a bowl to be given to "Toci", who drank some of it, and then began to growl terribly, reflecting her displeasure with the sacrifice, as Toci could never have enough cruelty to satisfy her blood-lust. Toci was greeted by a man dressed as Huitzilopochtli, her husband, and the two would engage in sexual gestures, to symbolize the "divine sexual union" that took place after Toci had been sacrificed, becoming a goddess who married Huitzilopochtli. The priest playing Toci would spread open his legs and arms, thereby imitating a woman ready for sex, which represented the sexual union between Toci and Huitzilopochtli after their marriage. The man playing Centeotl would then appear at their side to portray his birth, which also symbolized the growth of maize.

Upon being seated at the top of the temple, the priests would crown "Toci" with a crown made of paper. The priests would dress "Toci" with make-up, feathers and a dress, and once properly dressed, "Toci" would sacrifice four male prisoners brought before "her" by cutting out their hearts with an obsidian knife. "Toci" would then retire while the man playing Centeotl, the Maize Lord would appear at the front of the Great Pyramid to review a parade of warriors marching before him. The face mask of human skin was then sent out as a challenge for another people, for Ochpaniztli was always the beginning of the season of war.

After receiving weapons from the ruler, the warriors would sing and dance around the Great Pyramid while the women of Tenochtitlan would engage in much wailing at the prospect that their sons would die in the wars to come. At the end of the dancing and singing, priests would emerge from the Great Pyramid wearing the skin of other victims to throw maize seeds at the people. The Fire Priest of Huitzilopochtli would then set out a bowl full of chalk and feathers (symbols of death) at the top of the Great Pyramid while the warriors would charge up to toss around and smear the chalk and feathers upon themselves, showing their willingness to die in battle. "Toci" or "our grandmother" as the Mexica also called her would reemerge from the Great Pyramid and again the warriors would flee in mock terror from her. "Toci" then marched through the streets of Tenochtitlan to the edge of the city, where the priest would become "male" again by removing the skin of the young woman, which then stretched over a wooden platform to face visitors to Tenochtitlan. As "Toci" removed her skin, it symbolized the change in personality of "our grandmother" from the kindly goddess of healing and health to her real nature, the merciless goddess of war, the eater of men who could never have enough blood to drink and human flesh to devour.

== Symbolism ==
For the Mexica, sex and war were closely linked; sex led to children, which made it possible for boys to grow up to become the warriors who would fight the wars of the next generation and childbirth itself was the "battle" that every woman had to fight. The purpose of the Mexica Triple Alliance of states on the shores of Lake Texcoco was to fight wars and to take prisoners who would be sacrificed. The Mexica and their allies in the Triple Alliance believed that the gods would not allow the sun to rise every day unless they were given human flesh to eat the day before, thus requiring daily sacrifices at the Great Pyramid of Tenochtitlan and endless wars to supply the victims to die at the Great Pyramid. Sometimes at the end of Ochpaniztli, the warriors ran in mock terror to the edge of Tenochtitlan, where they may have engaged in mock battles with other warriors or may have actually raided the territories of other people engaging in real battles.

Sexual differences were key to the Mexica understanding of the universe, where male and female counterbalanced each other to achieve order in the cosmos. However, in the Mexica understanding of the world, the male body only became sacred after men were "made" into warriors via training and battle while the female body, capable of bearing life, was sacred in and of itself. Likewise, priests as men achieved their position through constant training while when the priests become "priestess" when draped in the body of a woman become powerful in and of themselves as the female body was always viewed as innately sacred.

Mexica society was a patriarchal one and war was a masculine activity. However, the appeal of female sexuality gave women a certain power over men, and thus women were always considered trouble-makers in Mexica society, which was full of stories of women using the appeal of their sexuality to manipulate men, and in the process causing much trouble. Given this view of women, it is no accident that one of the chief deities of war was Toci, the "Woman of Discord", who symbolized the troublesome appeal of female sexuality as a disruptive force. The sacrifices of the young people were done publicly and were always the cause of great celebration and joy among the Mexica who believed the Maize Lord would reward them with a good harvest in the coming year.

== Books ==
- Blake, Debra (2009). Chicana Sexuality and Gender: Cultural Refiguring in Literature, Oral History, and Art. Durham: Duke University Press.
- Clendinnen, Inga (1995). Aztecs: An Interpretation. Cambridge: Cambridge University Press.
- DiCesare, Catherine (2009). Sweeping the Way Divine Transformation in the Aztec Festival of Ochpaniztli. Denver: University Press of Colorado. ISBN 9780870819438.
- Harris, Max (2000). Aztecs, Moors, and Christians: Festivals of Reconquest in Mexico and Spain. Austin: University of Texas Press.
- Graulich, Michel (June 1989). "Miccailhuitl: The Aztec Festivals of the Deceased". Numen. 36 (1): 43–71. doi:10.1163/156852789X00153.
- Graulich, Michel (May 2000). "Aztec Human Sacrifice as Expiation". History of Religions. 39 (1): 352–371. doi:10.1086/463600.
- Windshuttle, Keith (1997). The Killing of History: How Literary Critics and Social Theorists Are Murdering Our Past. San Francisco: Encounter Books..
