= Xilonen =

Xilonen may refer to:

- Chicomecōātl, the Aztec goddess of agriculture
- Xilonen, the daily newspaper of the World Conference on Women, 1975
- Xilonen, a character in 2020 video game Genshin Impact
