= Tlazōlteōtl =

Aztec deity

Tlahzolteōtl
- Goddess of Sex, Sexuality, Lust, and Purification
- Member of the Nauhtzonteteo
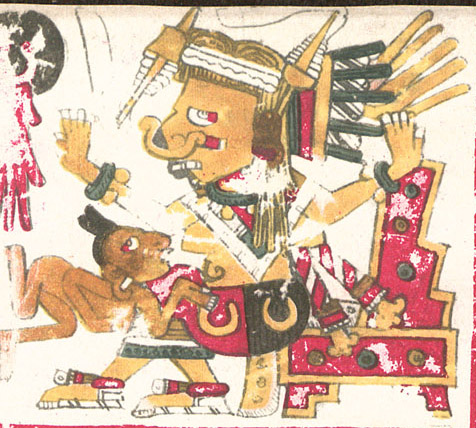
- Tlahzolteōtl as depicted in the Codex Borgia
- Other names: Tlahēlcuāni, Tlahzōlmiquiztli, Īxcuinān
- Abode: Tlalticpac
- Gender: Female
- Region: Mesoamerica
- Ethnic group: Aztec (Nahua)

Genealogy
- Parents: Omecihuatl (Emerged by Tecpatl)
- Siblings: the Nauhtzonteteo (1,600 gods)
- Children: With Piltzintecuhtli: Cinteotl (Codex Florentine)

Equivalents
- Otomi: Nopot’ejä

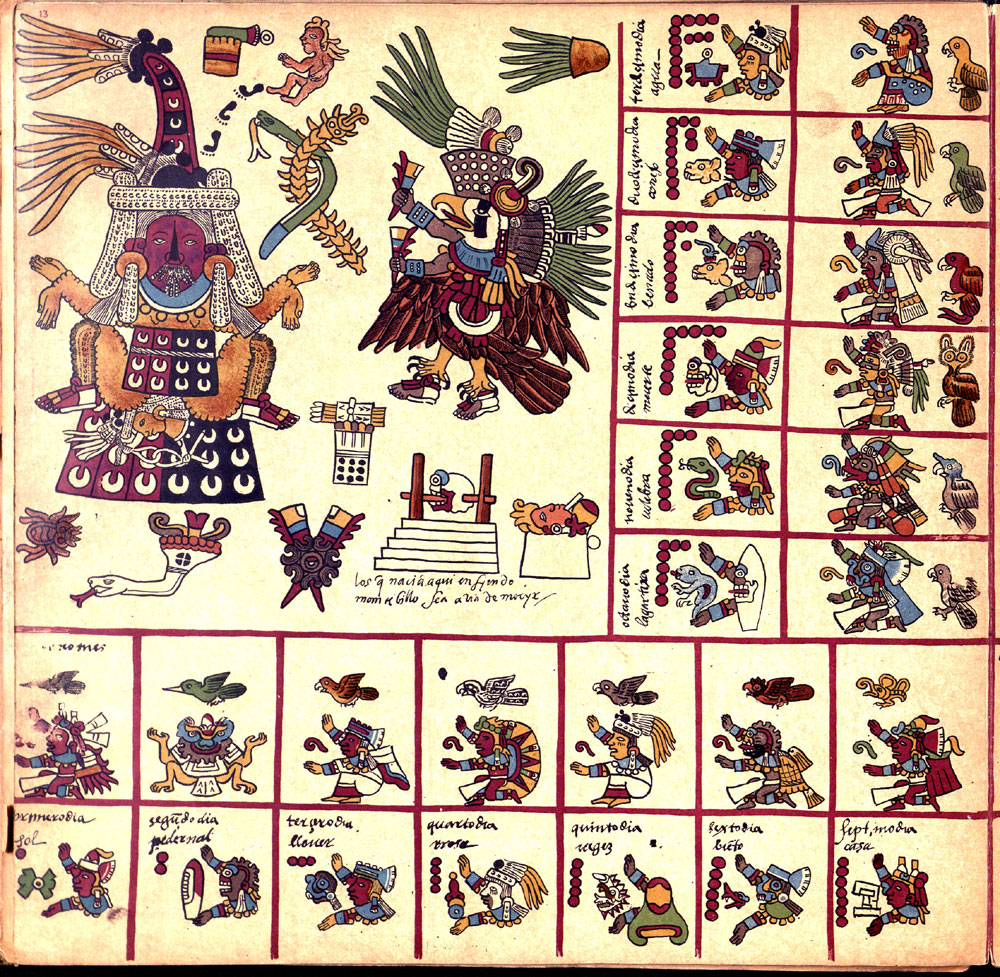
From the Codex Borbonicus, this shows the 13th trecena of the Aztec sacred calendar (tonalpohualli). The deity Tlazolteotl is wearing a flayed human skin and giving birth to Cinteotl. The 13 day-signs of this trecena, starting with 1 Earthquake, begin at the bottom left and wrap around.

In Aztec mythology, Tlahzolteōtl (or Classical Nahuatl: Tlâçolteotl, pronounced [t͡ɬaʔs̻oɬˈteoːt͡ɬ]) is a deity of sex, sexuality, lust, carnality, sin, vice, impurity, temptation, fertility, purification, absolution, steam baths, and a patroness of adulterers. She is known by three names, Tlahēlcuāni ("she who eats tlahēlli or filthy excrescence [sin]") and Tlazolmiquiztli ("the death caused by lust"), and Ixcuina or Ixcuinan (Huastec: Ix Cuinim, Deity of Cotton), the latter of which refers to a quadripartite association of four sister deities.

Tlazolteōtl is the deity for the 13th trecena of the sacred 260-day calendar Tōnalpōhualli, the one beginning with the day Ce Ōllin, or First Movement. She is associated with the day sign of the jaguar.

Tlazolteōtl played an important role in the confession of wrongdoing through her priests.

== Aztec religion ==
There was a Huastec mother goddess from the Gulf Coast who was assimilated into Aztec views of Tlazōlteōtl.

== Quadripartite deities ==
Under the name of Ixcuinan she was thought to be quadrupartite, composed of four sisters of different ages known by the names Tiyacapan (the first born), Tēicuih (the younger sister, also Tēiuc), Tlahco (the middle sister, also Tlahcoyēhua) and Xōcotzin (the youngest sister). When conceived of as four individual deities, they were called ixcuinammeh or tlazōltēteoh; individually, they were deities of luxury.

== Sin ==
=== Forgiveness of sin ===
According to Aztec belief, it was Tlazolteōtl who inspired vicious desires and who likewise forgave and cleaned away sin. She was also thought to cause disease, in particular sexually transmitted infections. It was said that Tlazolteōtl and her companions would afflict people with disease if they indulged in forbidden love. The uncleanliness was considered both on a physical and moral level. It could be cured by a steam bath, a rite of purification, or calling upon the Tlazoltēteoh, the deities of love and desires.

=== Purification ===
For the Aztecs, there were two main deities thought to preside over purification: Tezcatlipoca, because he was thought to be invisible and omnipresent, therefore seeing everything; and Tlazolteōtl, the deity of lechery and unlawful love. It is said that when a man confessed before Tlazolteōtl everything was revealed. Purification with Tlazolteōtl would be done through a priest. One could only receive the "mercy" once in their life, which is why the practice was most common among the elderly.

The priest (tlapouhqui) would be consulted by the penitent and would consult the 260-day ritual calendar (tōnalpōhualli) to determine the best day and time for the purification to take place. On that day, he would listen to the sins confessed and then render judgment and penance, ranging from fasts to presentation of offerings and ritual song and dance, depending on the nature and the severity of the sin.

=== Dirt eating ===
Tlazolteōtl was called "Deity of Dirt" (Tlazolteōtl) and "Eater of Ordure" (Tlahēlcuāni, 'she who eats dirt [sin]') with her dual nature of deity of dirt and also of purification. Sins were symbolized by dirt. Her dirt-eating symbolized the ingestion of the sin and in doing so purified it. She was depicted with ochre-colored symbols of divine excrement around her mouth and nose. In the Aztec language the word for sacred, tzin, comes from tzīntli, the buttocks, and religious rituals include offerings of "liquid gold" (urine) and gold (Nahuatl teocuitlatl "divine excrement", which Klein jocularly translated to English as "holy shit"). Through this process, she helped create harmony in communities.

== Festival ==
Tlazōlteōtl was one of the primary Aztec deities celebrated in the festival of Ochpaniztli (meaning "sweeping") that was held September 2–21 to recognize the harvest season. The ceremonies conducted during this timeframe included ritual cleaning, sweeping, and repairing, as well as the casting of corn seed, dances, and military ceremonies.

== In popular culture ==
In the film Raiders of the Lost Ark, the fictitious artifact, the Golden Idol is based on the actual Aztec Dumbarton Oaks birthing figure. The artifact is presumed to depict Tlazōlteōtl.

== Gallery ==
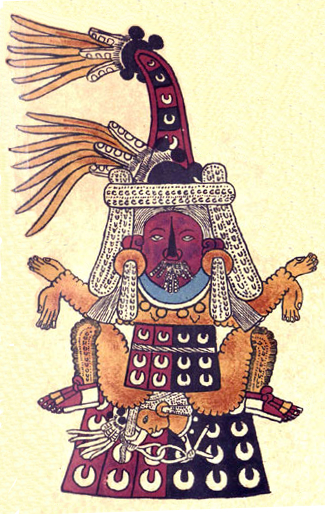
The moons represent the cyclical nature of sin and purification, and the animal motifs serve to ground the deity in the earth and indicate fertility.

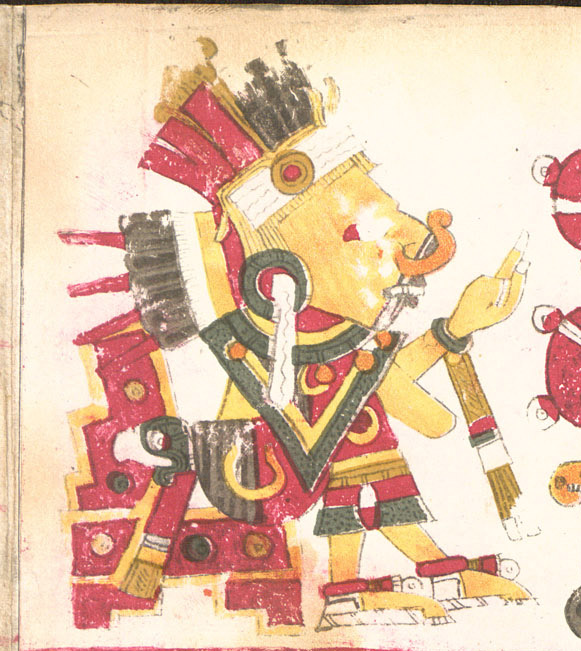
Another drawing from the Codex Borgia

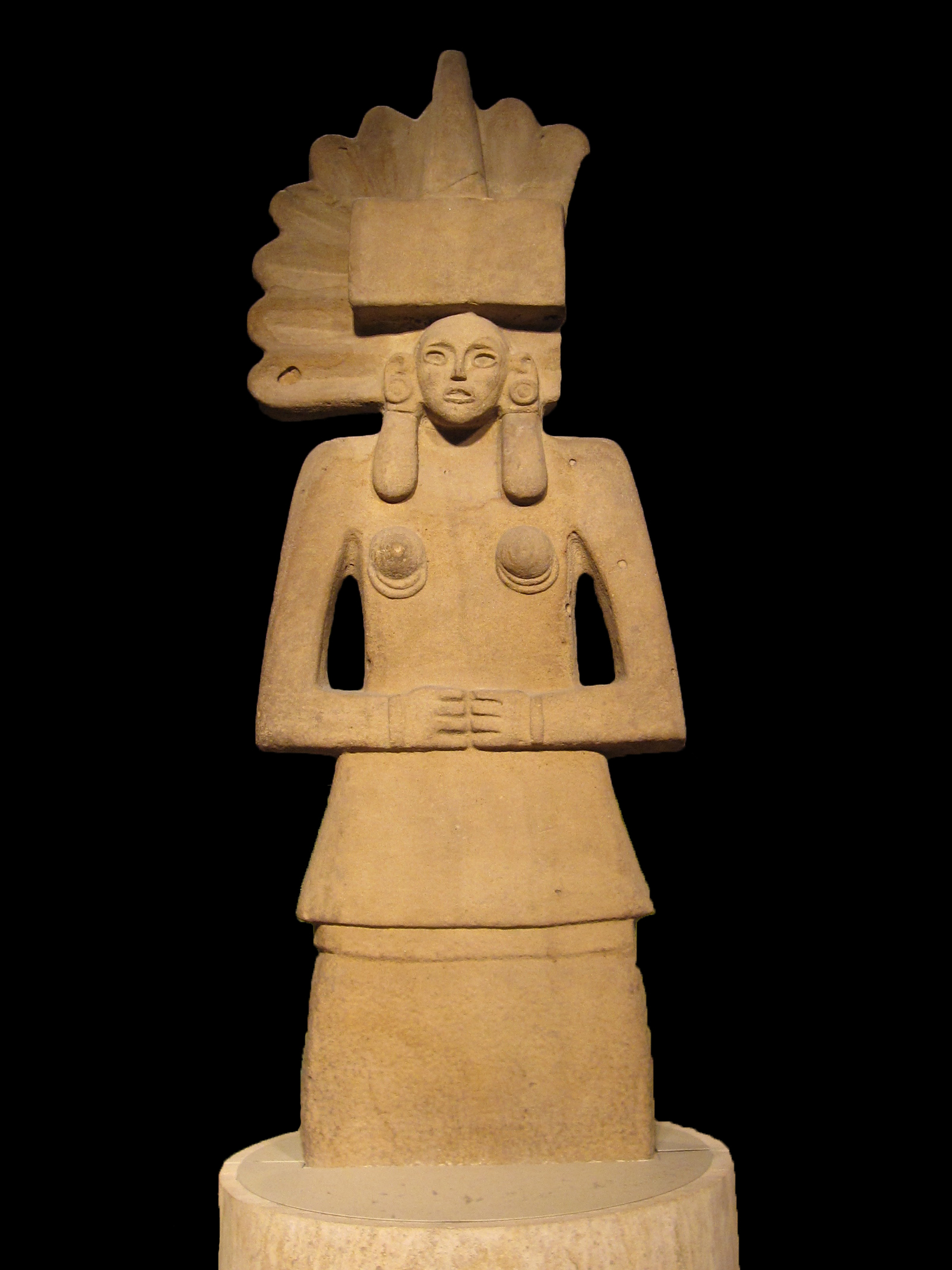
Huaxtec statue of Tlazōlteōtl from Mexico, 900-1450 CE (British Museum, id:Am,+.7001 )

== See also ==
- Xōchiquetzal
- Toilet god
