= Dumbarton Oaks birthing figure =

Figurine of a woman giving childbirth in a squatting position

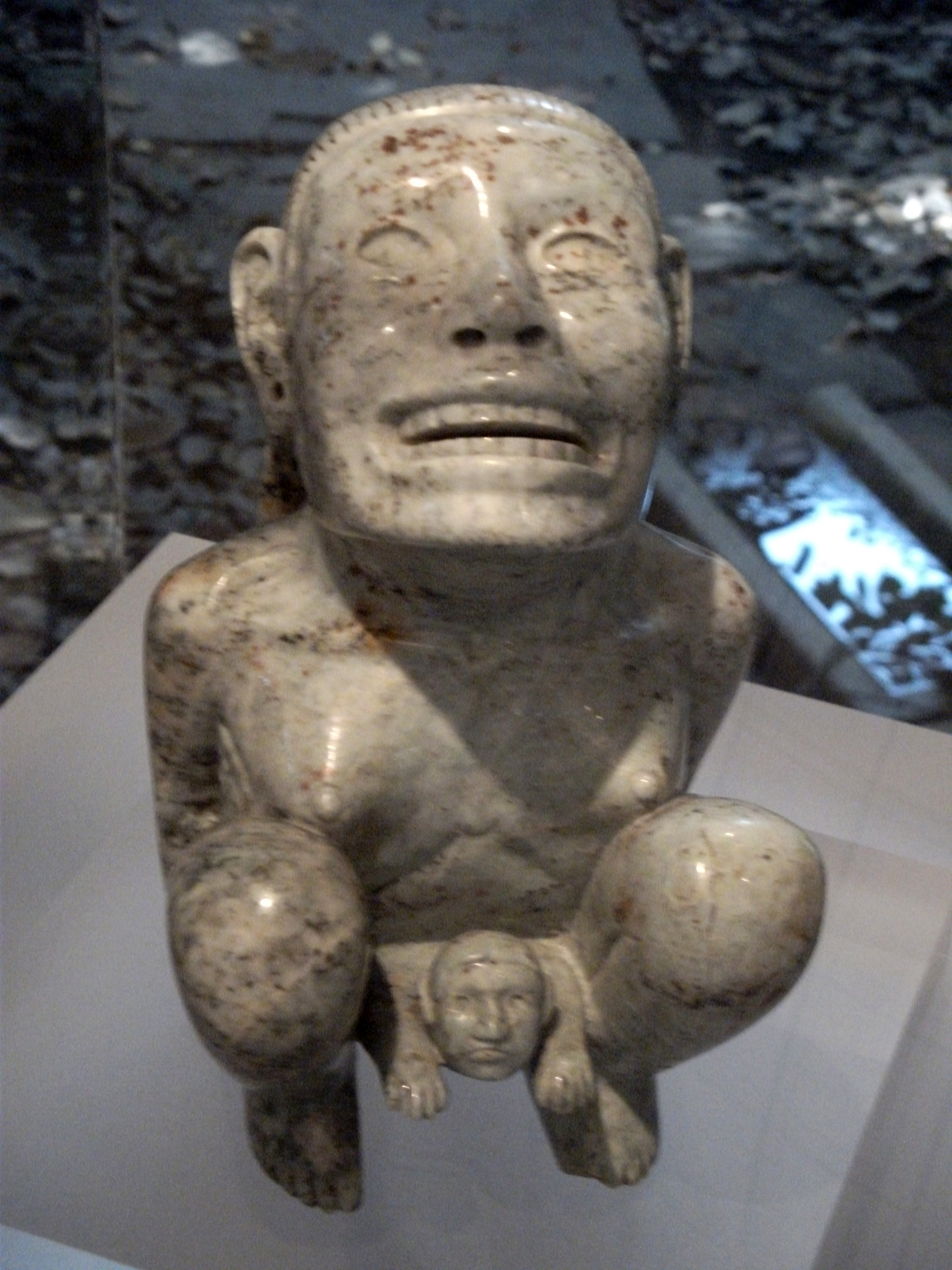
The Dumbarton Oaks birthing figure

The Dumbarton Oaks birthing figure is a possibly Aztec scapolite figurine of a woman giving birth in a squatting position. Housed in the Dumbarton Oaks collection, United States, the figurine is considered by several scholars to be a pre-Columbian artwork, while others believe it was made in modern times, possibly in the 19th century. The figurine measures 20.2 cm in height.

Birthing figures, while common in Colonial Mexican manuscripts, are rare in Aztec three-dimensional art. Women, however, occupied a prominent position in the Aztec mythology.

== Provenance ==
Early mentions of the figurine come from Ernest-Théodore Hamy, who first saw it in a Paris antique store. The figurine was later bought by French obstetrician and collector Alban Ribemont-Dessaignes. In 1947, the figure was acquired by Robert Woods Bliss, the founder of Dumbarton Oaks.

== Authenticity ==
The first scholarly article about the figurine was written by Ernest-Théodore Hamy in 1899 and called it "absolutely unique in the history of Mexican art". In 1906, Hamy published an article in the Journal de la Société des Américanistes writing that the figurine is of pre-Columbian Mexican origin and represents the Aztec goddess Ixcuina, also known as Tlazolteotl. Scholars such as Pal Kelemen, Miguel Covarrubias, John Alden Mason, Michael D. Coe and Jeffrey Quilter also considered the figurine to be authentic. Others, such as Claude-François Baudez and Esther Pasztory, question the figurine's stylistic features. The authenticity was also questioned on the basis of technical virtuosity compared to the technical limitations of pre-Columbian artisans. According to Jane MacLaren Walsh, "the essential nature of the sculpture is almost completely anomalous with regard to the accepted canon of Mexican art, and does not in fact resemble any other Mesoamerican art form" and "the choice of stone, the complicated carving in the round, the birthing position, the facial expression of the mother, the somewhat grotesque realism, the lack of iconographic detail all point to a highly idiosyncratic work".

== See also ==
- Golden Idol
