= Tloquenahuaque =

One of the epithets of Tezcatlipoca, a central deity in Aztec religion

In Aztec mythology, Tloquenahuaque, Tloque Nahuaque (Nahuatl pronunciation: [ˈt͡ɬoːkeʔ naːˈwakeʔ]) or Tloque Naoaque ("Lord of the Near and the Nigh") was one of the epithets of Tezcatlipoca. Miguel Leon Portilla argues that Tloque Nahuaque was also used as an epithet of Ometeotl, the hypothetical duality creator God of the Aztecs. Tloquenahuaque, also referred to as Tloque Nahuaque or Tloque Naoaque, is a creator god in Aztec mythology. Other Mesoamerican cultures knew this god by other names as well, such as Moyocoyani or Hunab Ku.

Alonso de Molina's Nahuatl-Spanish dictionary, published in 1571, defines "Tloque Nauaque" as, "next to whom is the being of all things, conserving them and sustaining them". The original Spanish is "cabe quien esta el ser de todas las cosas, conservándolas y sustentándolas".

== Bibliography ==
- Olivier, Guilhem (2003). Mockeries and Metamorphoses of an Aztec God: Tezcatlipoca, "Lord of the Smoking Mirror". Michel Besson (trans.). University Press of Colorado. ISBN 0-87081-745-0.
- León-Portilla, Miguel (1999). "Ometeotl, el supremo dios dual, Ometetl "Dios Principal"". Estudios de Cultura Náhuatl. 30.
- de Molina, Alonso (1571). Vocabulario en Lengua Castellana y Mexicana. p. 148.
- Supercurioso, Equipo. “Tloque Nahuaque | 10 Curiosidades Del Dios Creador Y Ordenador Mexica.” Supercurioso, Jan. 2019, supercurioso.com/tloque-nahuaque-dios-creador-y-ordenador.
- Godchecker. “TLOQUENAHUAQUE - the Aztec Supreme God (Aztec Mythology).” Godchecker - Your Guide to the Gods, www.godchecker.com/aztec-mythology/TLOQUENAHUAQUE.
- “A Mother for the Civilization of Love | EWTN.” EWTN Global Catholic Television Network, www.ewtn.com/catholicism/library/mother-for-the-civilization-of-love-5994.
