= Tezcatlipoca =

Aztec deity of darkness and violence

- God of providence, the invisible and darkness, lord of the Night; Ruler of the North
- Member of the Tezcatlipocas
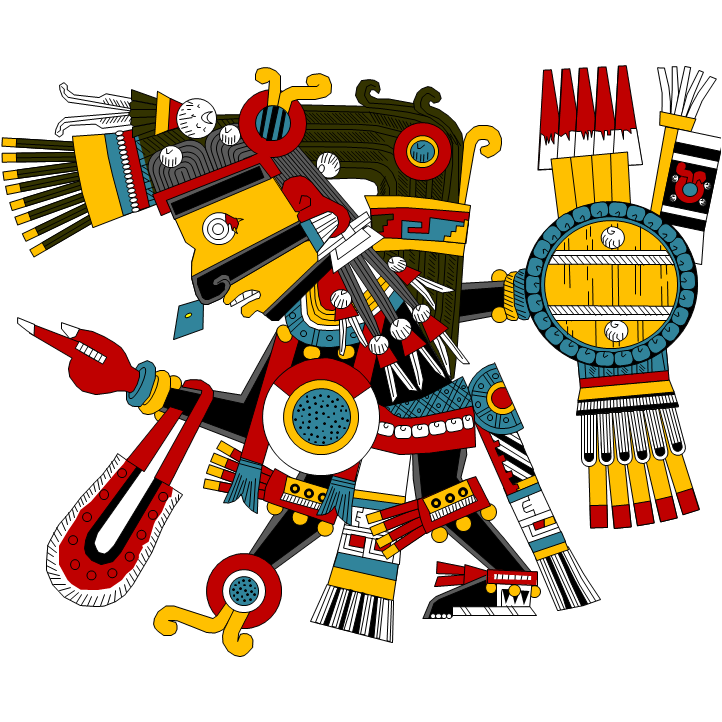
- Tezcatlipoca as depicted in the Codex Borgia
- Other names: Black Tezcatlipoca, Ometeteosij
- Abode: Ilhuicatl-Teteocan (Twelfth Heaven); Ilhuicatl-Yayauhco (Sixth Heaven); the North
- Symbol: Black Jaguar
- Gender: Male
- Region: Mesoamerica
- Ethnic group: Aztec, Tlaxcaltec, Toltec (Nahua)
- Festivals: Toxcatl

Genealogy
- Parents: Ometecuhtli and Omecihuatl (Codex Zumarraga)
- Siblings: Quetzalcoatl, Xipe-Totec, Huitzilopochtli (Codex Zumarraga)
- Consorts: Xochiquetzal, Huixtocihuatl, Xilonen, Atlatonan
- Children: None

The jaguar was an animal sacred to Tezcatlipoca.

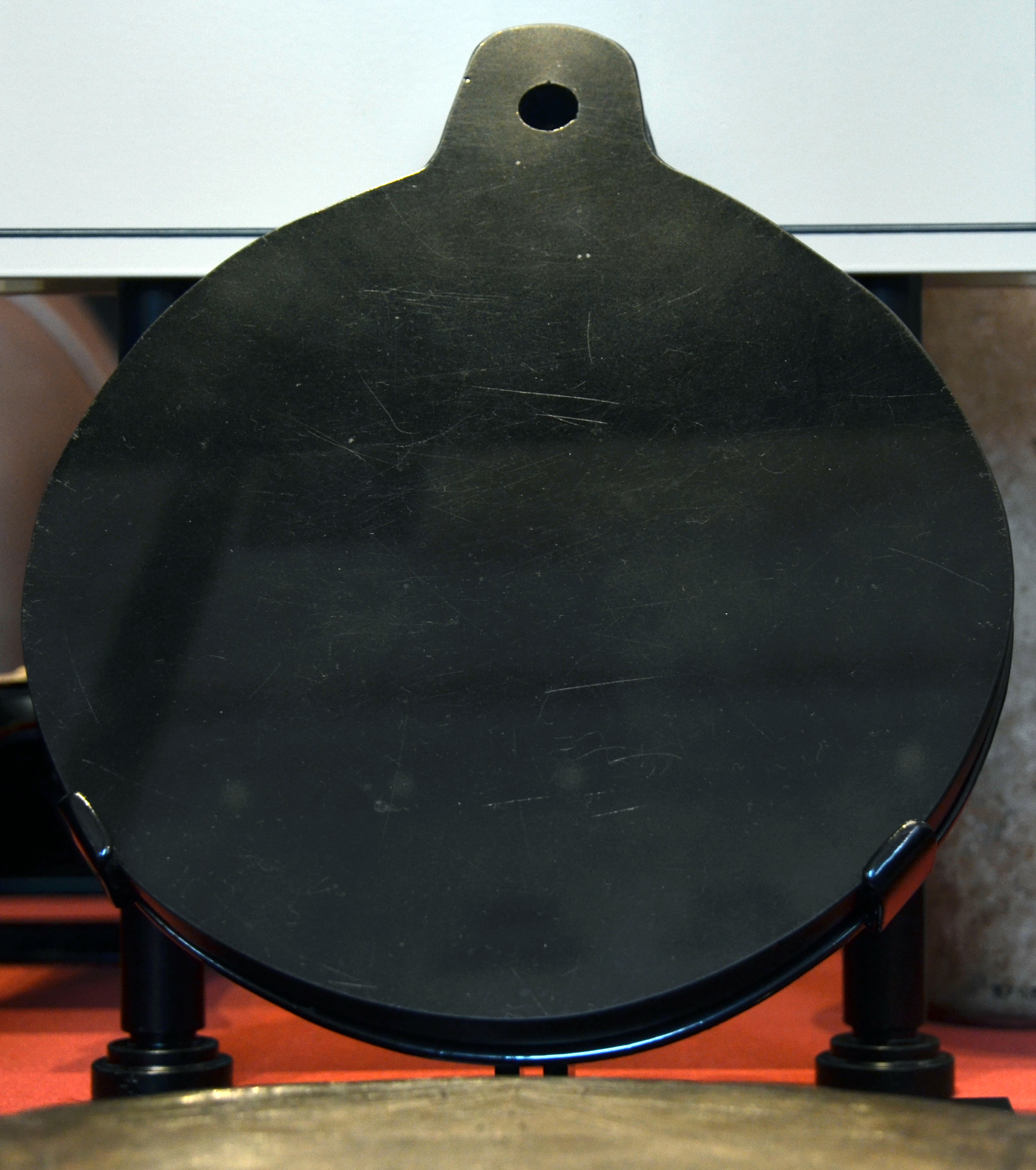
Aztec obsidian mirror

Tezcatlipoca (Classical Nahuatl: Tēzcatlīpohca [teːs̻kat͡ɬiːˈpoʔkaˀ]) was a central deity in Aztec religion. He is associated with a variety of concepts, including the night sky, hurricanes, obsidian, and conflict. He was considered one of the four sons of Ometecuhtli and Omecihuatl, the primordial dual deity. His main festival was Toxcatl, which, like most religious festivals of Aztec culture, involved human sacrifice.

Tezcatlipoca's nagual, his animal counterpart, was the jaguar. In the form of a jaguar he became the deity Tepeyollotl ("Mountainheart"). In one of the two main Aztec calendars (the Tonalpohualli), Tezcatlipoca ruled the trecena 1 Ocelotl ("1 Jaguar"); he was also patron of the days with the name Acatl ("reed"). A strong connection with the calendar as a whole is suggested by his depiction in texts such as the Codex Borgia and Codex Fejéváry-Mayer, where Tezcatlipoca is surrounded by day signs, implying a sort of mastery over them.

A talisman related to Tezcatlipoca was a disc worn as a chest pectoral, called the anahuatl. This talisman was carved out of abalone shell and depicted on the chest of both Huitzilopochtli and Tezcatlipoca in codex illustrations.

The origins of Tezcatlipoca can be traced to earlier Mesoamerican deities worshipped by the Olmec and Maya. Similarities exist between Tezcatlipoca and the patron deity of the K'iche' Maya, Tohil, as described in the Popol Vuh. The name Tohil refers to obsidian and he was associated with sacrifice. The Classic Maya god of rulership and thunder, K'awiil, was depicted with a smoking obsidian knife in his forehead and one leg replaced with a snake. (Note: Jun Raqan "the one-legged" was an epithet of this Classic Maya deity of rulership and thunder which eventually led to the English word "Hurricane".) Although there are striking similarities between possible earlier imagery of Tezcatlipoca, archaeologists and art historians are split in the debate. It is possible that he is the same god that the Olmec and Maya term their "jaguar deity", or alternately that he is an Aztec expansion on foundations set by the Olmec and Maya, as the Aztecs routinely took deliberate inspiration from earlier Mesoamerican cultures.

== Etymology ==
Tezcatlipoca is often translated from the Nahuatl as "smoking mirror." (Note: For a discussion of the many interpretations of the meaning of the name Tezcatlipoca, see Olivier (2003) pp. 14-15.) It alludes to his connection to obsidian, the material from which mirrors were made in Mesoamerica. They were used for shamanic rituals and prophecy, and as such Tezcatlipoca is additionally associated with divination.

Tezcatlipoca had many epithets which alluded to different aspects of his deity and also point to his centrality in Aztec worship. Bernardino de Sahagún, in Book VI of the Florentine Codex, refers to Tezcatlipoca with 360 different forms. These include:

- Tloque Nahuaque, meaning "lord of the near and nigh"; "the one who owns what surrounds [us]"
- Titlacahuan, Titlacahua or Titlacaua, meaning " [of whom] we are [his] servants"; "[he] whose [servants] we are"
- Tehimatini, meaning "the wise"; "the one who understands people"
- Tlazopilli, meaning "the precious nobleman"; "the precious son"
- Teyocoyani, meaning "the creator [of people]"
- Yáotl or Yaotzin, meaning "the enemy"; "the venerable enemy"
- Icnoacatzintli, meaning "the merciful"
- Ipalnemoani, meaning "[he] by whom [we] all live"
- Ilhuicahua, meaning "possessor of heaven"
- Tlalticpaque, meaning "possessor of the earth"
- Monenequi, meaning "the arbitrary"; "the one who pretends"
- Pilhoacatzintli, meaning "revered father"; "possessor of children"
- Tlacatlé Totecué, meaning "our master, our lord"
- Yoalli Ehécatl, Yohualli Ehécatl or Youalli Ehécatl, meaning "night wind"(metaphor for "invisible" or "impalpable")
- Monantzin, meaning "your mother"
- Motatzin, meaning "your father"
- Telpochtli, meaning "[the] young man"
- Moyocoyani or Moyocoani, meaning "the one who creates himself." His calendrical name is Ome Ácatl, "Two Reed", and under that name he consecrates himself as another deity.

== Representations ==
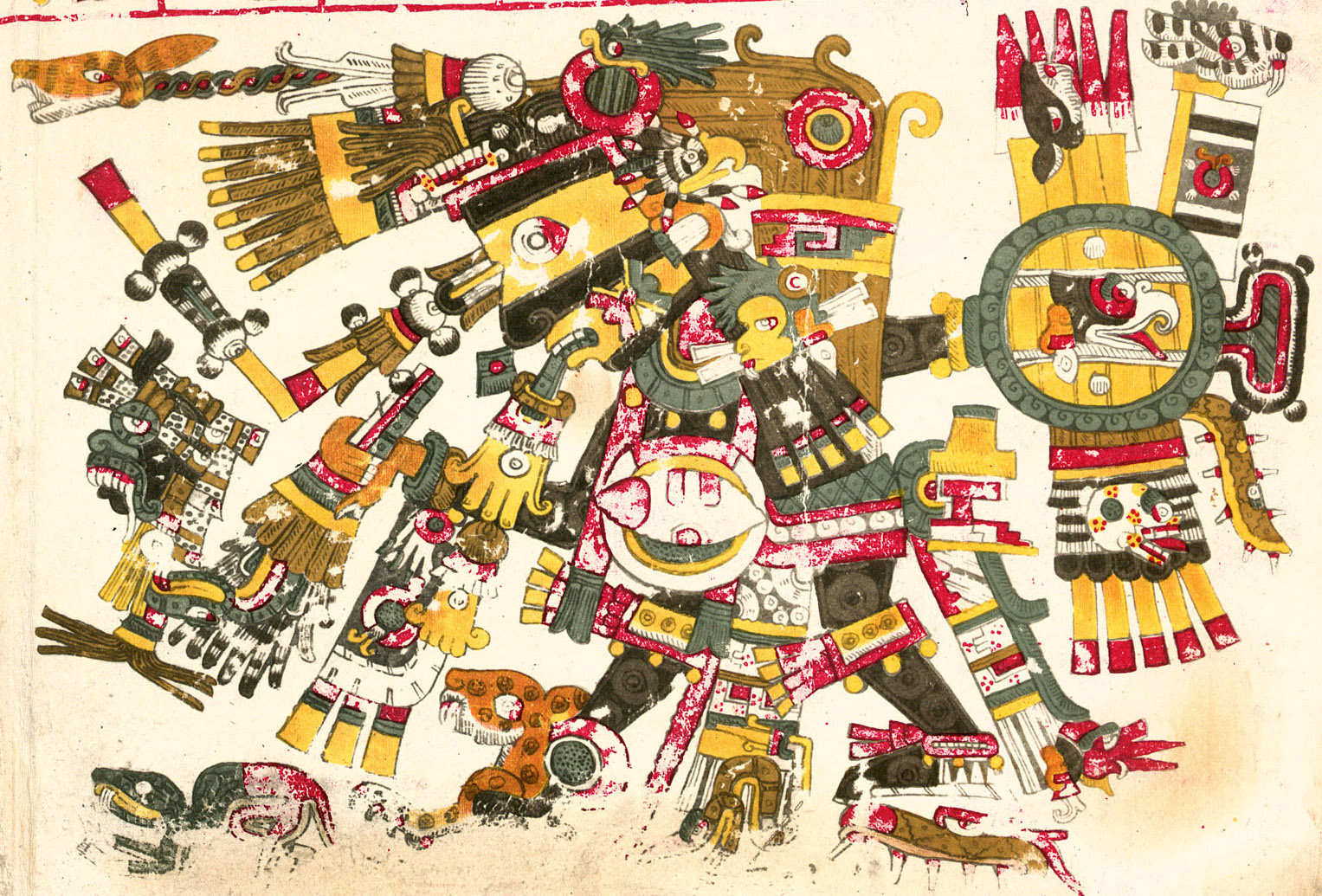
Tezcatlipoca with all 20 day signs, symbolizing the divine calendar (Codex Borgia)

Few representations of Tezcatlipoca survive into the present day, due in large part to a significant portion of codices being destroyed by Catholic priests. Simultaneously, some Aztec texts note that the darkness and omnipresence of Tezcatlipoca make him something akin to "invisible", thus direct representations of him are considered inadequate or even impossible. Still, multiple depictions of the deity exist, and common trends and symbols can be identified.

=== Iconography ===
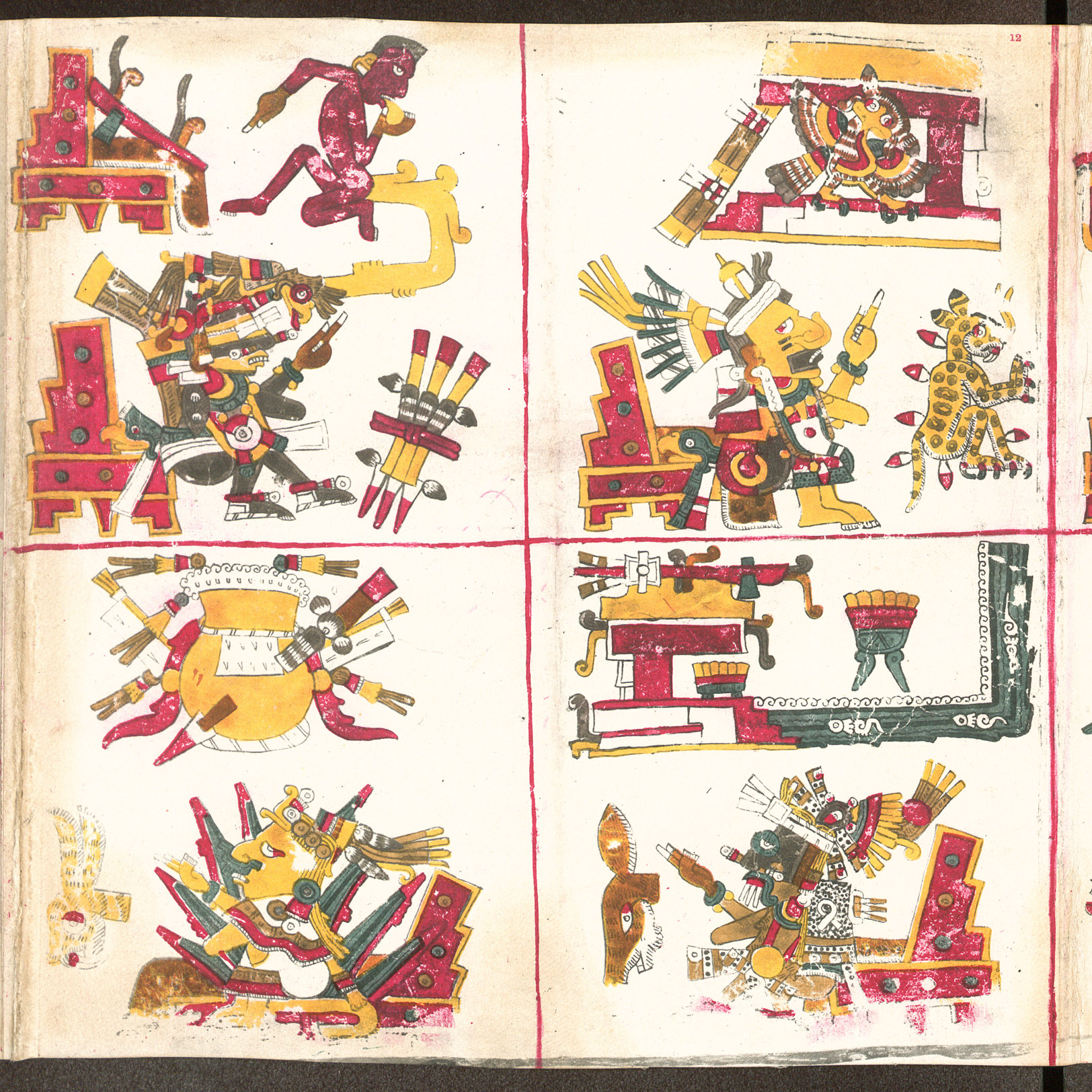
Tezcatlipoca on page 12 of the Codex Borgia

One of the most recognizable iconographic details of Tezcatlipoca is his face paint, called mixchictlapanticac. Most commonly, he is shown with horizontal bands of black and yellow, though codices may vary in which two colors are depicted. Mary Miller has posited that the combination of yellow and black might be a connection to the jaguar, with which Tezcatlipoca is associated. Black is the foremost color associated with Tezcatlipoca, not only because of his role as a god of nighttime and darkness, but to differentiate him from the other three so-called Tezcatlipocas (Quetzalcoatl, Huitzilopoctli, and Xipe-Totec) and their respective colors (white, blue, and red). Which parts of his body are painted black varies by site; half of his leg, the full length of his arms, the majority of his legs, or any combination thereof can be depicted. Later scholarship has identified the black material with which the god was supposedly painted as tezcatlipoctli. He is often depicted with various symbolic objects in place of his right foot, such as an obsidian mirror, bone, or a serpent. This is an allusion to the creation myth, in which Tezcatlipoca loses his foot battling with the earth monster Cipactli. The obsidian mirror may also appear on his chest, as a breastplate, and often is shown emanating smoke — a literal representation of his name and role. In the majority of representations, Tezcatlipoca bears the mirror in one hand, where it is surrounded by feathers of various colors.

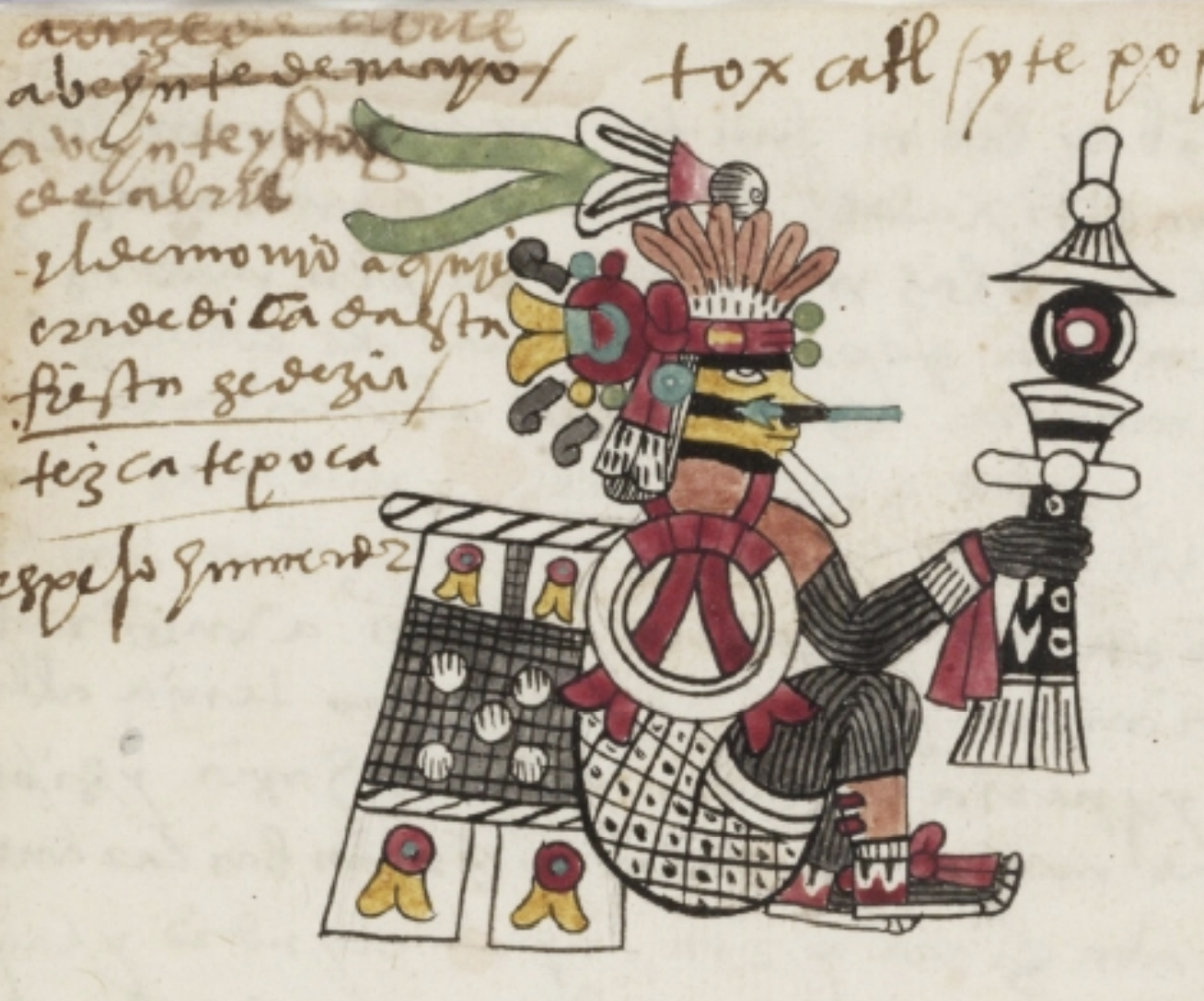
Representation in Codex Tudela, where the ezpitzal is shown as a headband and garland

Tezcatlipoca often wears a headdress of feathers, flowers, and/or flint knives. His head could be additionally ornamented with the symbol for smoke. Heron feathers or balls of eagle down, like that from which Huitzilopochtli was born, often adorned his head, clothing, and shield. He variably wore earrings, necklaces, bracelets, and other jewelry, all rendered in precious materials like gold and jade. A motif of skulls and crossbones is recorded appearing in some pictures, but likely would have followed the European popularization of such a design. Many iconographic elements highlight Tezcatlipoca's role as a warrior, including his shield, his anahuatl breastplate, his arrow nose ring, and his spears, or arrows.

=== Ezpitzal ===
Scholar Juan José Batalla Rosado has identified an iconographic element unique to depictions of Tezcatlipoca in codices from central Mexico, which both Rosado and Sahagún call the "ezpitzal." The term is likely derived from the Nahuatl words for "blood" (eztli) and "to become enflamed with anger" or "to rise with anger" (pitza). Alternate translations for pitza make reference to blowing or playing instruments like the flute, which appear during the Toxcatl fest and may then have some relation with Tezcatlipoca himself. The term ezpitzal has since been translated as "flow of blood", but Rosado additionally points out the sense of rage and violence the ezpitzal is meant to signify—an element which points to Tezcatlipoca's nature and his role as a god of conflict. The ezpitzal is one or more streams of blood shown emanating from Tezcatlipoca's head, sometimes accompanied by the symbol for a flint knife or a heart. In some cases, the idea of the ezpitzal was artistically transformed into a headband or garland, adorned with flowers or stones.

=== Codex Fejéváry-Mayer ===
Frontispiece in question (Codex Fejéváry-Mayer)

The frontispiece of the Codex Fejéváry-Mayer, one of the more well-known images from Aztec codices, features a god circumscribed in the 20 trecena, or day symbols, of the Tōnalpōhualli. The exact identity of this god is unclear, but is most likely either Tezcatlipoca or Xiuhtecutli. The figure has yellow and black face paint, as is characteristic of Tezcatlipoca. But as Olivier points out, "gods like Xiuhtecutli or Huitzilopoctli have similar facial painting." The figure is also shown with two unaltered feet, but does possess the white sandals, armbands, and adorned ears and head of Tezcatlipoca. He also carries arrows and a spear, the typical weapons of the war god. Finally, perhaps coincidentally, the figure is bounded on the left side by the symbols for acatl (reed) and tecpatl (flint knife), both of which are associated with Tezcatlipoca.

Depicting either Tezcatlipoca and Xiuhtecutli surrounded by calendrical symbols is equally logical in both cases, as Tezcatlipoca is represented in other codices in association with the calendar, and Xiuhtecutli was a god of the sun and passage of time. The page also features the ollin symbol, a trecena that additionally represented eras of time, including the five suns. These mythological eras were begun by Tezcatlipoca, but Aztec festivals which celebrated the completion of eras involved worship of Xiuhtecutli. The codex features additional, more standardized depictions of both deities in its later pages.

== Temples ==
Many of the temples associated with Tezcatlipoca are built facing east–west, as Olivier quotes Felipe Solis: "the sacred building of the war god [Tezcatlipoca] was in direct relation with the movement of the sun, in the same manner of the Great Temple was, their façades being towards the West". There are also several references to momoztli. Although the exact definition of the momoztli is unknown, with definitions varying from "mound", "stone seat" and "temple", there is an overall consensus that it is a general holy place to worship the gods, specifically mentioned as "his [Tezcatlipoca's] viewing place".

== Priests ==
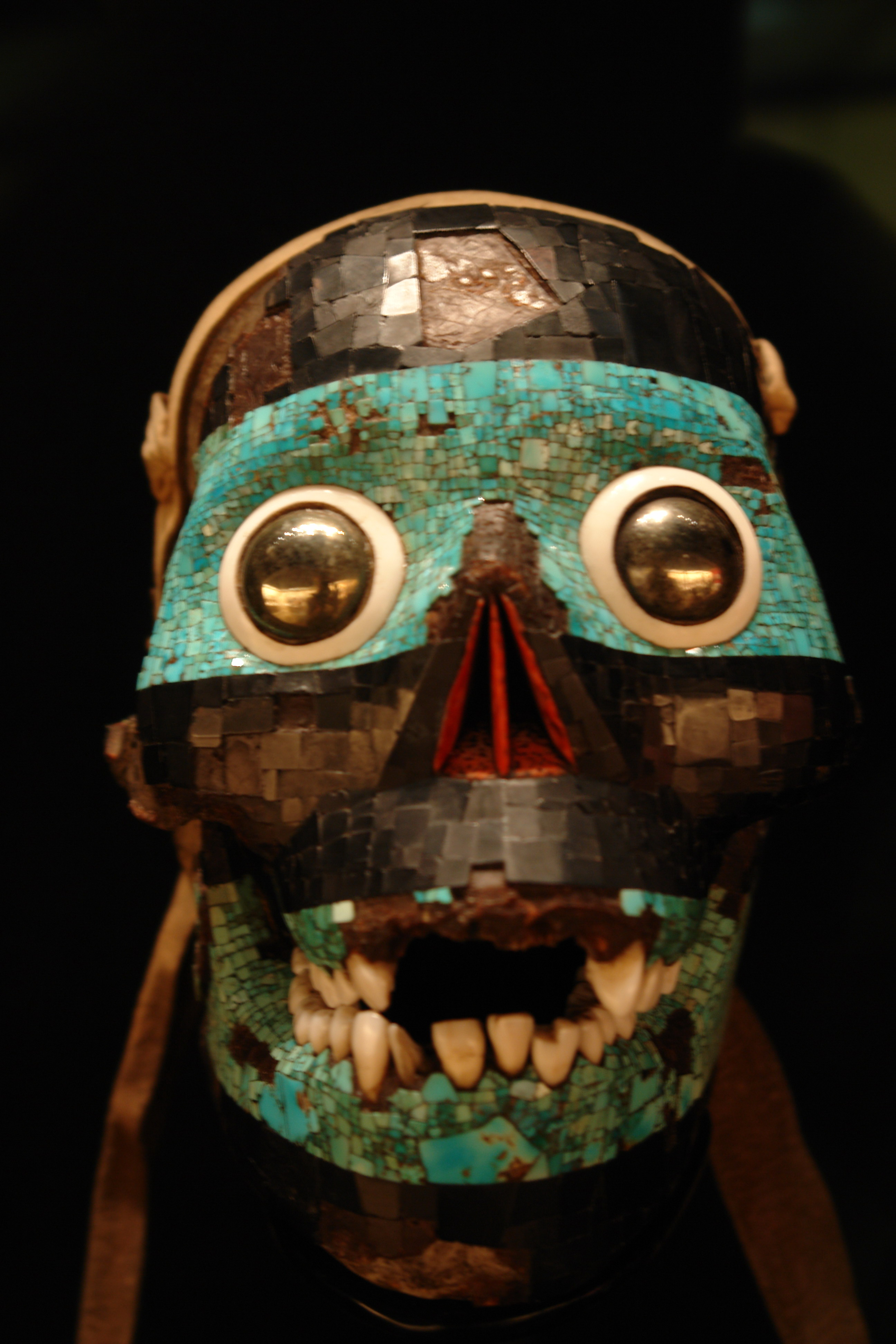
Mask representing Tezcatlipoca formed from a human skull, likely worn by priests during sacred rites. Turquoise with iron pyrites for the eyes. From the British Museum

The priests of Tezcatlipoca often wore the ornaments of the god and wore specific garments for different rituals. Most frequently worn were white turkey feather headdresses, a paper loincloth, and a tzanatl stick with similar feathers and paper decorations. Another common practice was to cover themselves in black soot or ground charcoal while they were involved in priestly activities at the temple or during rituals. They would also cover the sick and newly appointed king in a similar manner with a black ointment to encourage an association with the god. When the ritual called for it, priests would also dress up as Tezcatlipoca himself and accompany other similarly outfitted gods or goddesses.

Several types of priests were dedicated to the service of Tezcatlipoca, one of them likely being the one Sahagún calls "huitznahuac teohua omacatl". Others were the calmeca teteuctin who were allowed to eat the ritual food offered to Tezcatlipoca, still more accompanied the impersonator of Tezcatlipoca in the year prior to his execution. Honoring Tezcatlipoca was fundamental to both the priesthood and the nobility. "On his installation", the new king fasted and meditated, "which included prayers in honor of Tezcatlipoca, the patron deity of the royal house". Tezcatlipoca's priests were offered into his service by their parents as children, often because they were sick. These children would then have their skin painted black and be adorned with quail feathers in the image of the god. Sacred hymns were also chanted at ceremonies to honor the gods. Most were sung to praise the highest deities, including Tezcatlipoca, who was often addressed as the "Giver of Life". In one hymn, he is mentioned as being both the creator and destroyer of the world, and both as a poet and a scribe. Everyone, including commoners, high priests, and the king, were involved in some aspect of the Toxcatl ceremonies.

== Tezcatlipoca and Quetzalcoatl ==
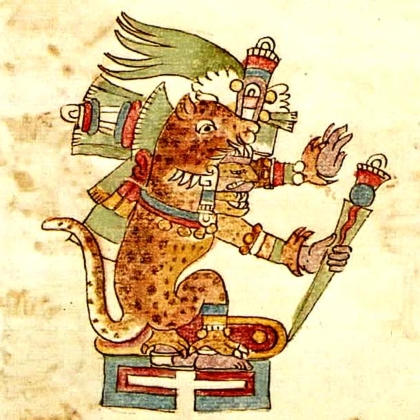
Tezcatlipoca depicted in the Codex Rios in the aspect of a Jaguar—in this form he was called Tepeyollotl.

Tezcatlipoca was often described as a rival of another important god of the Aztecs: the culture hero, Quetzalcoatl. In one version of the Aztec creation account the myth of the Five Suns, the first creation, "The Sun of the Earth" was ruled by Tezcatlipoca but destroyed by Quetzalcoatl when he struck down Tezcatlipoca who then transformed into a jaguar. Quetzalcoatl became the ruler of the subsequent creation "Sun of Water", and Tezcatlipoca destroyed the third creation "The Sun of Wind" by striking down Quetzalcoatl.

In later myths, the four gods who created the world, Tezcatlipoca, Quetzalcoatl, Huitzilopochtli and Xipe Totec were referred to respectively as the Black, the White, the Blue and the Red Tezcatlipoca. The four Tezcatlipocas were the sons of Ometecuhtli and Omecihuatl, lady and lord of the duality, and were the creators of all the other gods, as well as the world and all humanity.

The rivalry between Quetzalcoatl and Tezcatlipoca is also recounted in the legends of Tollan, wherein Tezcatlipoca deceives Quetzalcoatl, ruler of the legendary city, and forces him into exile. Quetzalcoatl and Tezcatlipoca both collaborated in the different creations and that both were seen as instrumental in the creation of life. Karl Taube and Mary Miller, specialists in Mesoamerican studies, write that, "More than anything Tezcatlipoca appears to be the embodiment of change through conflict." A large and detailed depiction of Tezcatlipoca appears in the Codex Borgia carrying the 20 day signs of the calendar; in the Codex Cospi he is shown as a spirit of darkness, as well as in the Codex Laud and the Dresden Codex. His cult was associated with royalty, and was the subject of the most lengthy and reverent prayers in the rites of kingship, as well as being mentioned frequently in coronation speeches. The temple of Tezcatlipoca was in the Great Precinct of Tenochtitlan.

== Creation stories ==
In one of the Aztec accounts of creation, Quetzalcoatl and Tezcatlipoca joined forces to create the world. Before their act there was only the sea and the primordial, crocodilian earth monster called Cipactli. To attract her, Tezcatlipoca used his foot as bait for Cipactli, and she, in turn, ate it. The two gods then captured her, and distorted her to make the land from her body. After that, they created the people, and people had to offer sacrifices to comfort Cipactli for her sufferings. Because of this, Tezcatlipoca is depicted with a missing foot.

Following this, Tezcatlipoca turned himself into the sun. As a result of his transformation, this and all subsequent ages of humanity were referred to as the five suns. Quetzalcoatl was furious, so he knocked Tezcatlipoca out of the sky with a stone club. Angered, Tezcatlipoca turned into a jaguar and destroyed the world. Quetzalcoatl, then, replaced him as the sun and started the second age of the world, and it became populated again.

Tezcatlipoca overthrew Quetzalcoatl, forcing him to send a great wind that devastated the world, and the people who survived were turned into monkeys. Tlaloc, the god of rain, then became the sun. But he had his wife stolen away by Tezcatlipoca. Angered in turn, he would not make it rain for several years until, in a fit of rage, he made it rain fire. The few people who survived the assault turned into the birds.

Chalchiuhtlicue the Water Goddess then became the sun. However, she was crushed by Tezcatlipoca's accusation that she only pretended to be kind. She cried for many years and the world was destroyed by the resulting floods. Those who survived the deluge were turned into fish.

== Aztec religion and reverence ==
According to Aztec belief, Tezcatlipoca had a great many associations: the night sky, night winds, hurricanes, the north, the earth, obsidian, hostility, discord, rulership, divination, temptation, jaguars, sorcery, beauty, war, and conflict.

His main temple in Tenochtitlan was located south of the Templo Mayor. According to Diego Durán, it was "lofty and magnificently built. Eighty steps led to a landing twelve or fourteen feet wide. Beyond it stood a wide, long chamber the size of a great hall ...". There were several smaller temples dedicated to Tezcatlipoca in the city, among them the ones called "Tlacochcalco" and "Huitznahuatl". Tezcatlipoca was also worshipped in many other Nahua cities such as Texcoco, Tlaxcala and Chalco. Each temple had a statue of the god for which copal incense was burned four times a day.

The Codex Magliabechiano contains a passage relating Tezcatlipoca with the temascal, or sweatbath. The text states, "when any sick person went to the bath house, [they] offered incense, which they call copal, to the idol and covered the body in black in veneration of the idol they call Tezcatepocatl [Tezcatlipoca], who is one of their major gods." Despite these references, Mary Miller states that the deity actually depicted in codex illustrations and the one more likely to be associated with the temascal is Tlazoteotl.

=== Toxcatl ===
Tezcatlipoca's main feast was Toxcatl, which occurred during the eponymous fifth month of the Aztec calendar. (Note: For an in depth description and interpretation of the Toxcatl festival see Olivier (2003) Chapter 6.) The preparations began a year in advance, when a young man was chosen by priests to become the likeness of Tezcatlipoca. This individual was called the teixiptla or "deity impersonator" and was chosen to ceremonially represent the god to the Aztec people. The teixiptla was usually selected from among captive warriors, and the chosen individual was bathed and ceremoniously cleansed for the role that he was to undertake. Sometimes, slaves were purchased for the ceremony. Benardino de Sahagún describes in the Florentine Codex how the teixiptla must possess certain physical qualities in order to be worthy of becoming Tezcatlipoca:

For he who was chosen was of fair countenance, of good understanding and quick, clean body— slender like a reed; long and thin like a stout cane; well-built; not of overfed body, not corpulent, and neither very small nor exceedingly tall. [He was] like something smoothed, like a tomato, or like a pebble, as if hewn of wood ... He who was thus, without flaw, who had no [bodily] defects, who had no blemishes, no moles, who had no lacerations or wrinkles on his body, they then looked well that he be taught to blow the flute ...

For the duration of Toxcatl's preparation, the teixiptla lived as a god would, wearing expensive jewelry and having eight attendants. The young man also was dressed in the likeness of the god and people on the streets would worship him as such when encountered. "For one year he lived a life of honor," the handsome young man "worshipped literally as the embodiment of the deity". During the last 20 days before being sacrificed, the teixiptla had their appearance transformed back to that of a warrior. "He had been a warrior who was captured, and he ended his life as a warrior." He would then be wed to four young women, also chosen in advance and isolated for a full year and treated as goddesses. This marriage, occurring after a full year of abstinence, symbolized a period of fertility which followed the drought. The young man would spend his last week singing, feasting and dancing. During the feast where he was worshipped as the deity he personified, he climbed the stairs to the top of the temple on his own where the priests seized him, a time in which he proceeded to symbolically crush "one by one the clay flutes on which he had played in his brief moment of glory", and then was sacrificed, his body being eaten later. The young man would approach this sacrifice willingly, as being sacrificed in this manner was a great honor. "Sacrificial victims mounted the bloody steps of the pyramid with dignity and pride." "The sacrifice itself marked the end of the drought." Immediately after he died a new victim for the next year's ceremony was chosen. Tezcatlipoca was also honoured during the ceremony of the ninth month, when the Miccailhuitontli "Little Feast of the Dead" was celebrated to honour the dead, as well as during the Panquetzaliztli "Raising of Banners" ceremony in the 15th month.

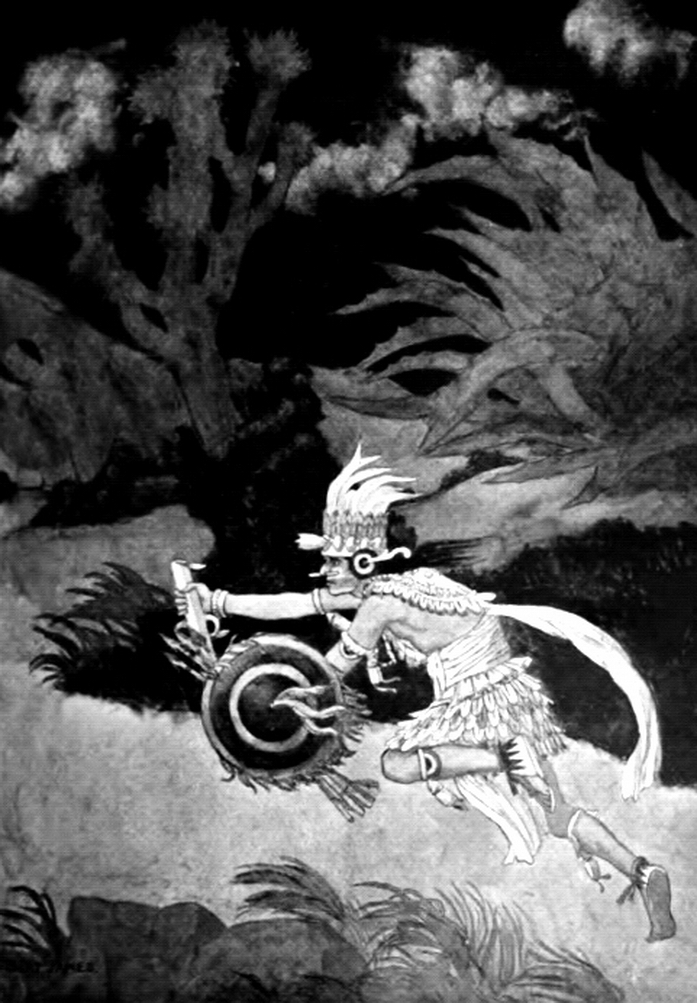
Tezcatlipoca "Lord of the Night Winds"

For Aztec nobility, this "patron deity" is fundamental in the social and natural phenomena justified by religion during this time. Extreme reverence and respect, characterized by ceremonial proceedings in which priests were "to pay homage" to Tezcatlipoca, or where "citizens waited expectantly" for ceremonial proceedings to start under the low hum of "shell trumpets," were commonplace, especially for this deity. Utter respect from the highest position of Aztec nobility, the king, shown through the figurative and literal nakedness of his presence in front of Tezcatlipoca. The king would stand "naked, emphasizing his utter unworthiness", speaking as nothing but a vessel for the god's will. The new king would claim his spiritual nakedness symbolically through words and physical vulnerability, praising Tezcatlipoca with lines such as:

O master, O our lord, O lord of the near, of the night, O night, O wind ... Poor am I.
In what manner shall I act for thy city? In what manner shall I act for the governed, for the vassals (macehualtin)?
For I am blind, I am deaf, I am an imbecile, and in excrement, in filth hath my lifetime been ...
Perhaps thou mistaketh me for another; perhaps thou seekest another in my stead

For kings, lords, priests, and citizens alike, the cyclical nature they observed every day and every year was portrayed not through science or philosophical debate, but utter reverence and respect for the spiritual beings they believed were the cause of these events. It was gods like Tezcatlipoca that solidified this notion, representing both the silent wind, and thunderous war.

== Gallery ==
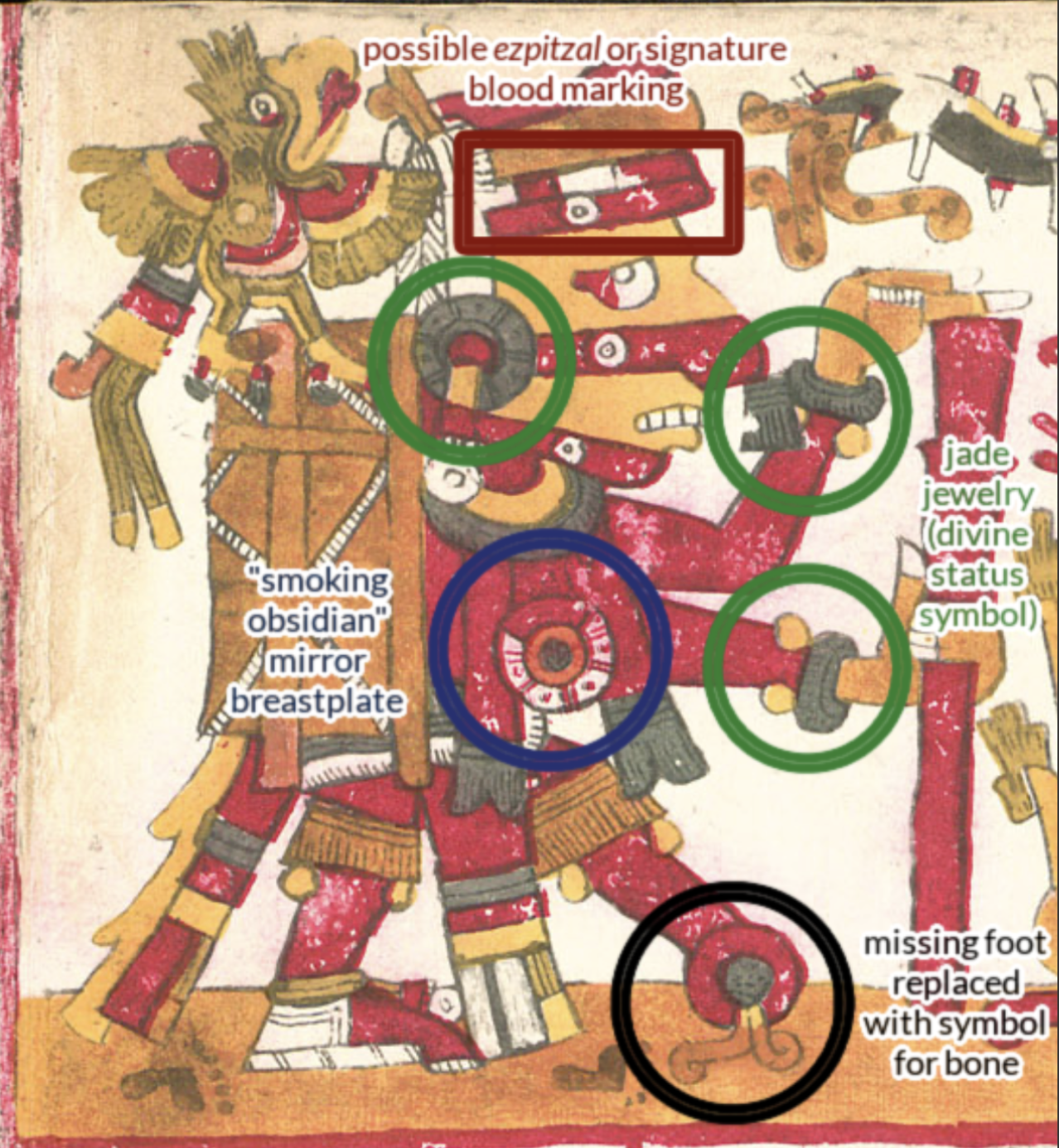
Red Tezcatlipoca from Codex Borbonicus with iconographic annotations

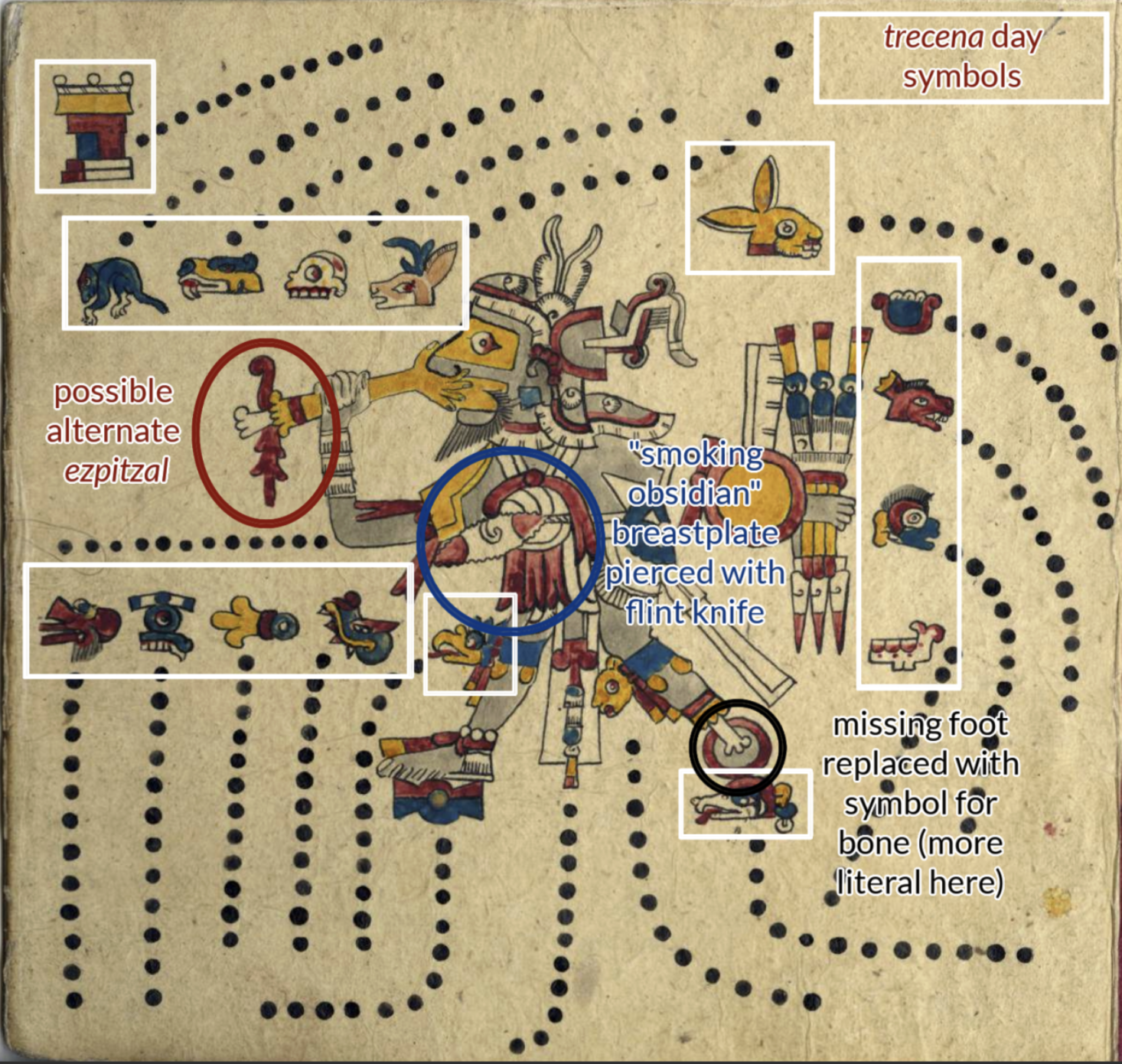
Tezcatlipoca from Codex Fejevary-Mayer with iconographic annotations

== See also ==
- Jaguars in Mesoamerican cultures
- Lords of the Night (mythology)
- Nagual
- Quetzalcoatl

== Footnotes ==
=== References ===
- Coe, Michael; Koontz, Rex (2008). Mexico: From the Olmecs to the Aztecs (6th ed.). Thames & Hudson Ltd, London. ISBN 978-0-500-28755-2.
- Miller, Mary; Taube, Karl (1993). The Gods and Symbols of Ancient Mexico and the Maya. Thames and Hudson. ISBN 0-500-05068-6.
- Olivier, Guilhem (2003). Mockeries and Metamorphoses of an Aztec God: Tezcatlipoca, "Lord of the Smoking Mirror". Translated by Besson, Michel. University Press of Colorado. ISBN 0-87081-745-0.
- Smith, Michael (2003). The Aztecs (2nd ed.). Blackwell. ISBN 978-0-631-230-168.
- Heyden, Doris; Carrasco, David (1991). Dryness Before the Rains: Toxcatl. University Press of Colorado. ISBN 0-87081-194-0.
