= Golden Idol =

Fictitious artifact

- Indiana Jones franchise element
- Fictional "golden idol" (ancient goddess of fertility) from the 1981 feature film Raiders of the Lost Ark.
- Publisher: Lucasfilm Ltd.
- First appearance: Raiders of the Lost Ark; (1981)
- Created by: Steven Spielberg; George Lucas
- Genre: Adventure

In-universe information
- Type: Idol
- Owners: Indiana Jones
- Affiliation: Pachamama; Aztec culture Indiana Jones

The Chachapoyan Fertility Idol, more commonly referred to as the Golden Idol, is a fictitious artifact that appears in the opening sequence of the 1981 film Raiders of the Lost Ark, the first entry in the Indiana Jones franchise created by George Lucas (films directed by Steven Spielberg). It is the first relic that the audience sees the protagonist Indiana Jones acquire, establishing him as a treasure hunter. The idol's likeness has become iconic in popular culture.

== In the film ==
In the film Raiders of the Lost Ark, the idol is portrayed as resting in an ancient, abandoned temple in South America. The specific location is not given in the film, other than a subtitle that reads "South America, 1936".

== Fictional history ==
Based on the film, game, and Indiana Jones comic books, the idol was erroneously attributed to the Chachapoyan tribe in Peru, South America, although the specimen from which it was modeled is carved of greenstone, attributed to the Aztec culture, and is currently on exhibit at the Dumbarton Oaks collections in Washington, D.C. It was sought in 1936, in the Peruvian Amazon jungle, by archaeologist/treasure hunter Indiana Jones. Jones had heard of the idol when a score of golden purportedly Chachapoyan figurines began to appear on the antiquities market. Jones and Marcus Brody, curator of the National Museum, believed that hitherto undiscovered Chachapoyan temples had been located and were being plundered. Evidence pointed to one of Jones's competitors, a Princeton archaeologist named Forrestal (another fictional character), who had embarked on an expedition to Peru a year earlier and never returned. With help from the journal of a 19th-century explorer and contacts in South America, Jones follows in Forrestal's footsteps, determined to acquire the real prize: a golden representation of the Chachapoyan goddess of fertility and childbirth, said to be secreted in the heart of the Temple of Warriors. While penetrating the Temple of Warriors, Jones finds Forrestal's remains impaled on the wooden spikes of a booby trap.

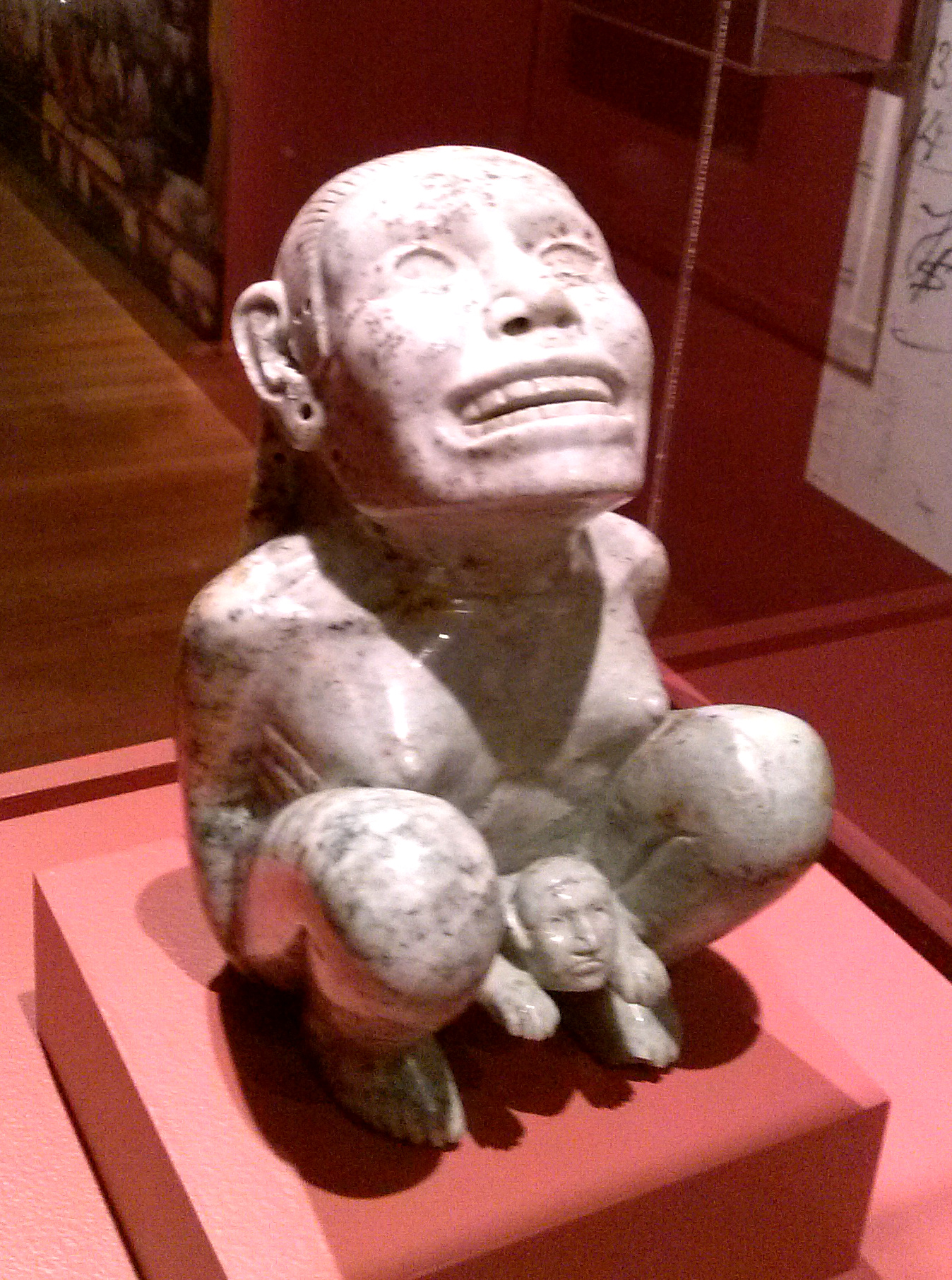
The original Aztec birthing figure from Dumbarton Oaks. Recent microscopic analysis of the incisions and drill holes has determined that they were most probably made by modern tools.

The golden idol was placed upon an ancient Chachapoyan altar. Its exact weight precisely holds an ancient self-destruct mechanism in place. Jones knows of the booby trap and attempts to replace the idol with a bag of sand. His attempt fails when he incorrectly estimates the weight of the idol. After escaping the many traps set by the Chachapoyans including a giant boulder, he finds rival archaeologist Rene Belloq waiting outside with a group of Hovitos, the local natives. Surrounded and outnumbered, Jones is forced to give up the artifact to Belloq. Jones escapes from Belloq and the Hovitos after a jungle pursuit, flying away on a waiting seaplane.

As related in the Indiana Jones comics, years later, Indy regains the idol from a black market antiquities dealer located in Marrakesh, Morocco (where Jones, in Raiders of the Lost Ark, deduces that Belloq sold it). However, also on the trail for the idol is Xomec, a descendant of the Chachapoyans, and Ilsa Toht, sister of Gestapo agent Arnold Toht. The two want to use the idol to unite Amazonian tribes and disrupt wartime rubber production in South America, as well as lure Jones to his death.

== Historical basis ==
The film prop idol was based on the actual Dumbarton Oaks birthing figure in the pre-Columbian collection at Dumbarton Oaks. The artifact is presumed to depict the Aztec goddess Tlazolteotl. Scientific analysis by the Smithsonian, though, shows the Dumbarton figure to be a probable fake from the late nineteenth century. Other scholars are less certain, but express similar doubts.

The Chachapoya culture was a genuine subject of interest for scientists under the Nazi government, particularly Jacques de Mahieu, who like the fictional Belloq was a French collaborator. Based on quotations from Spanish colonists (many of them fabricated), and on his interpretations of since-refuted archaeological digs, he argued that descendants of Vikings had once ruled Peru.

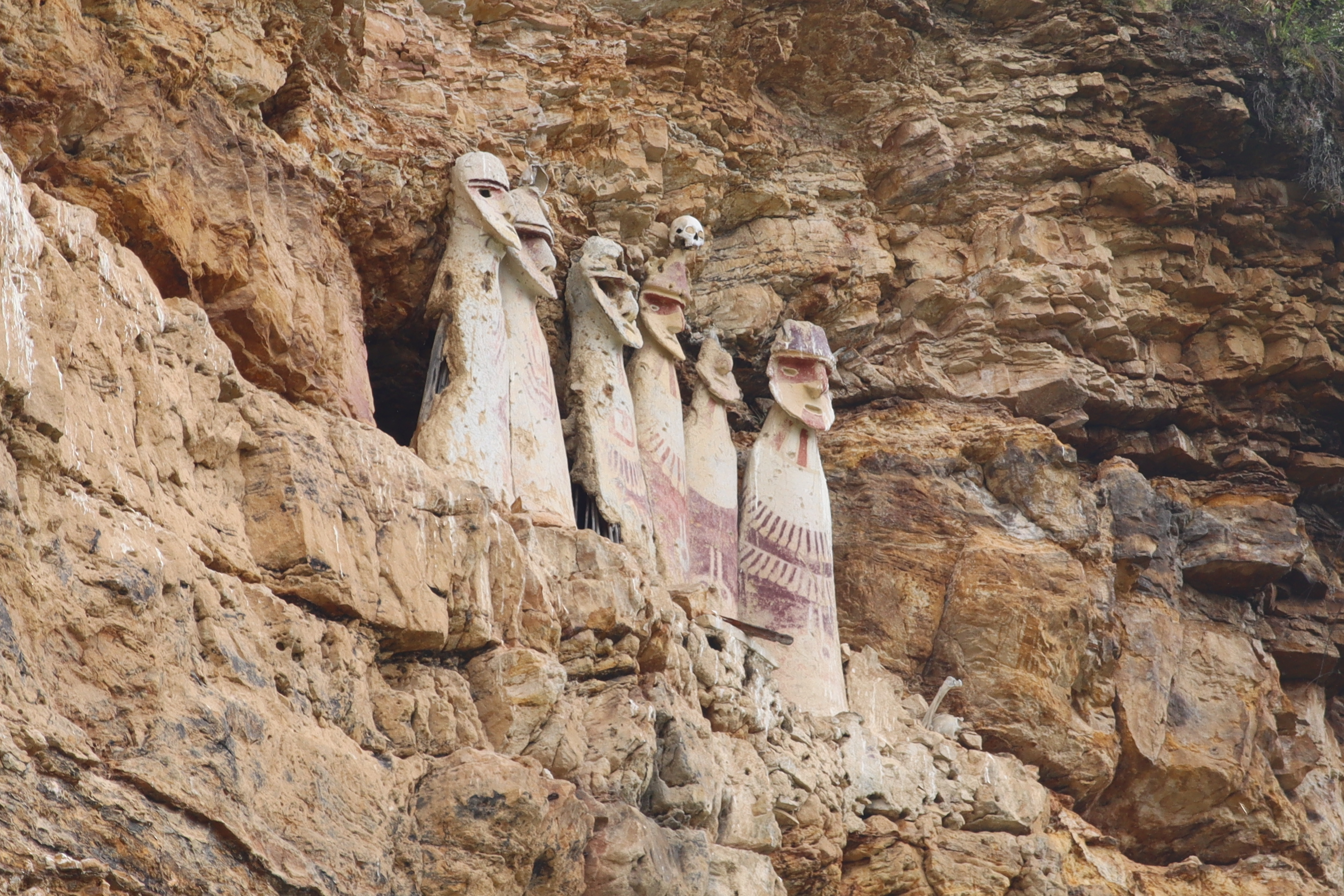
The Chachapoya Sarcophagi of Carajia.

In reality the Chachapoya did not build the elaborate trap systems portrayed in the film. However, they were accomplished builders of fortified cities, as sites like the Kuélap settlement show. These structures were characteristically built on high slopes, unlike the temple hidden in heavily jungled lowlands in the film. Their sculptural style was far different from that of the Golden Idol, as shown by the sarcophagi at Carajía.

== Inspiration ==
The prologue of Raiders is an homage to Carl Barks' Scrooge McDuck adventure The Seven Cities of Cibola, published in Uncle Scrooge #7 from September 1954. This homage in the film takes the form of playfully mimicking the removal-of-the-statuette-from-its-pedestal and the falling-stone sequences of the comic book.
