= Piltzintecuhtli =

Aztec Deity

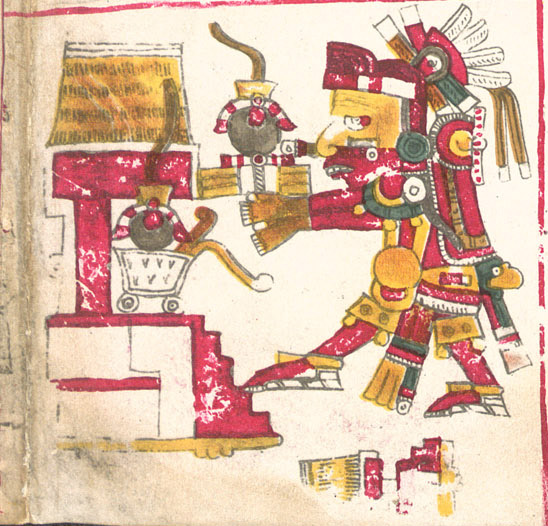
- A drawing of Piltzintecuhtli, one of the deities described in the Codex Borgia
- Gender: male

In Aztec mythology, Piltzintecuhtli [piɬt͡sinˈtekʷt͡ɬi] was a god of the rising sun, healing, and visions, associated with Tōnatiuh. The name means "the Young Prince". It may have been another name for Tōnatiuh, but he is also mentioned as a possibly unique individual, the husband of Xōchiquetzal. He was the lord of the third hour of the night. Piltzintecuhtli was said to be the son of Oxomoco and Cipactonal (the first man and woman that were created) and was seen as a protector of children. He was identified as the Youthful Sun.

Known also as "7 Flower," he was also a god of hallucinatory plants, including mushrooms.

He was considered the father of Centeōtl, a deity who was sacrificed in order to bring forth plants.

== See also ==
- Suns in alchemy#Sol Niger
- Sol (Roman mythology)
