= Tepēyōllōtl =

Aztec jaguar god

- the Eighth Hour of the Night
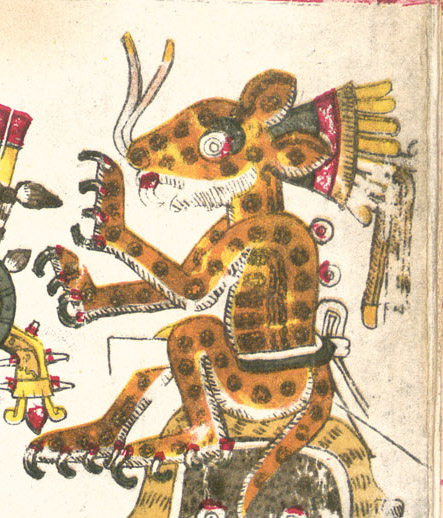
- Tepeyollotl, Codex Borgia.
- Gender: Male

Tepeyollotl was depicted as a jaguar, which was a sacred animal to him.

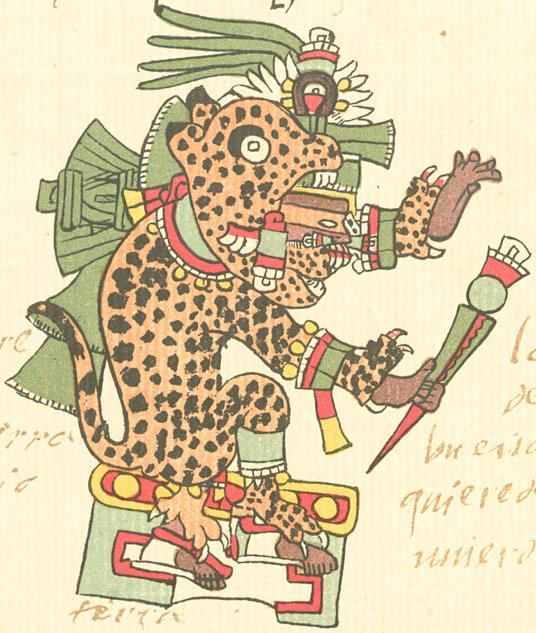
Tepeyollotl in the Codex Telleriano-Remensis.

In Aztec mythology, Tepēyōllōtl (Nahuatl pronunciation: [ˈtepeːˈjoːlːoːt͡ɬ]; "heart of the mountains"; also Tepeyollotli) was the god of darkened caves, earthquakes, echoes and jaguars. He is the god of the Eighth Hour of the Night, and is depicted as a jaguar leaping towards the Sun. In the calendar, Tepeyollotl rules over both the third day, Calli (house), and the third trecena, 1-Mazatl (deer).

The word is derived as a compound of the Nahuatl words tepētl ("mountain"), and yōllōtl ("heart" or "interior"). Tepeyollotl is usually depicted as cross-eyed holding the typical white staff with green feathers. Sometimes Tezcatlipoca wore Tepeyollotl for an animal skin or disguise to trick other gods into not knowing who he was.

== See also ==
- List of Aztec gods
