= Chicomecōātl =

Aztec deity

Chicōmecōātl
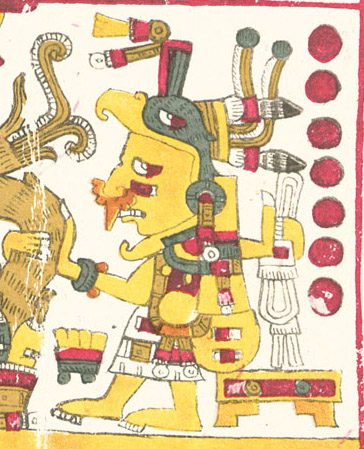
- Chicōmecōātl, as depicted in the Codex Borgia
- Gender: female

In Aztec mythology, Chicōmecōātl [t͡ʃikoːmeˈkoːaːt͡ɬ] "Seven Serpent", was the Aztec goddess of agriculture during the Middle Culture period. She is sometimes called "goddess of nourishment", a goddess of plenty and the female aspect of maize.

More generally, Chicōmecōātl can be described as a deity of food, drink, and human livelihood.

She is regarded as the female counterpart of the maize god Centeōtl, their symbol being an ear of corn. She is occasionally called Xīlōnen, 'corn dolly made of unripe maize', who was married also to Tezcatlipoca.

== Significance of name ==
Chicomecōātl's name, "Seven Serpent", is thought to be a reference to the duality of the deity. While she symbolizes the gathering of maize and agricultural prosperity, she also is thought to be harmful to the Aztecs, as she was thought to be of blame during years of poor harvest.

== Appearance and depiction ==
Her appearance is mostly represented with red ochre on the face, paper headdress on top, water-flowers patterned shirt, and foam sandals on the bottom. She is also described as carrying a sun flower shield.

She is also often depicted with attributes of Chalchiuhtlicue, such as her headdress and the short lines rubbing down her cheeks. Chicomecōātl is usually distinguished by being shown carrying ears of maize. She is shown in three different forms:

- As a young girl carrying flowers
- As a woman who brings death with her embraces
- As a mother who uses the sun as a shield
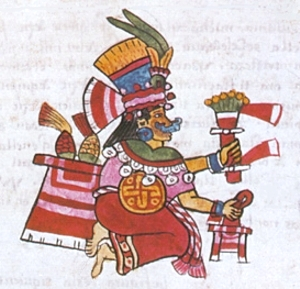
Chicomecōātl, as depicted in Codex Magliabechiano

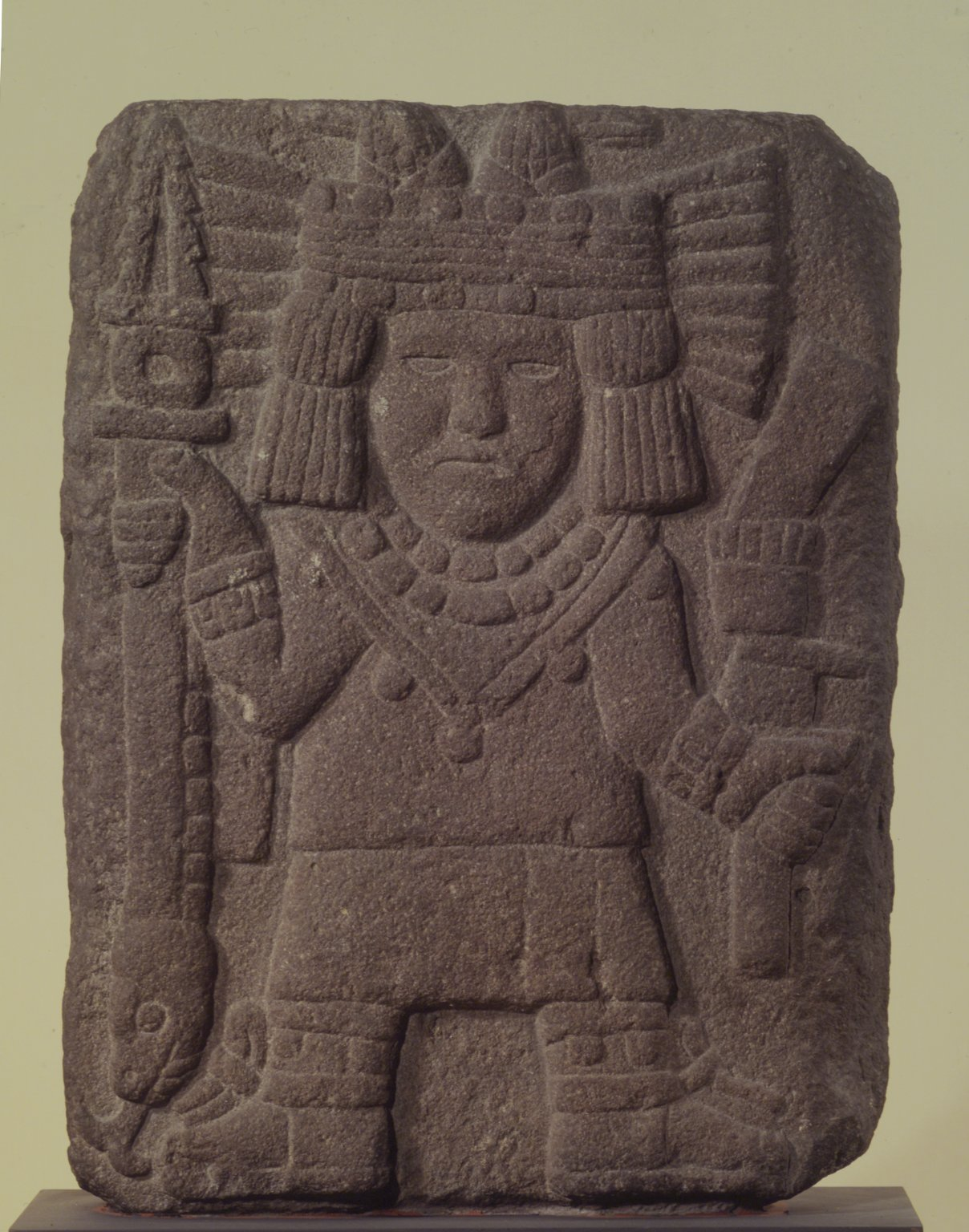
Relief with Maize Goddess (Chicomecóatl), Stone, Aztec.

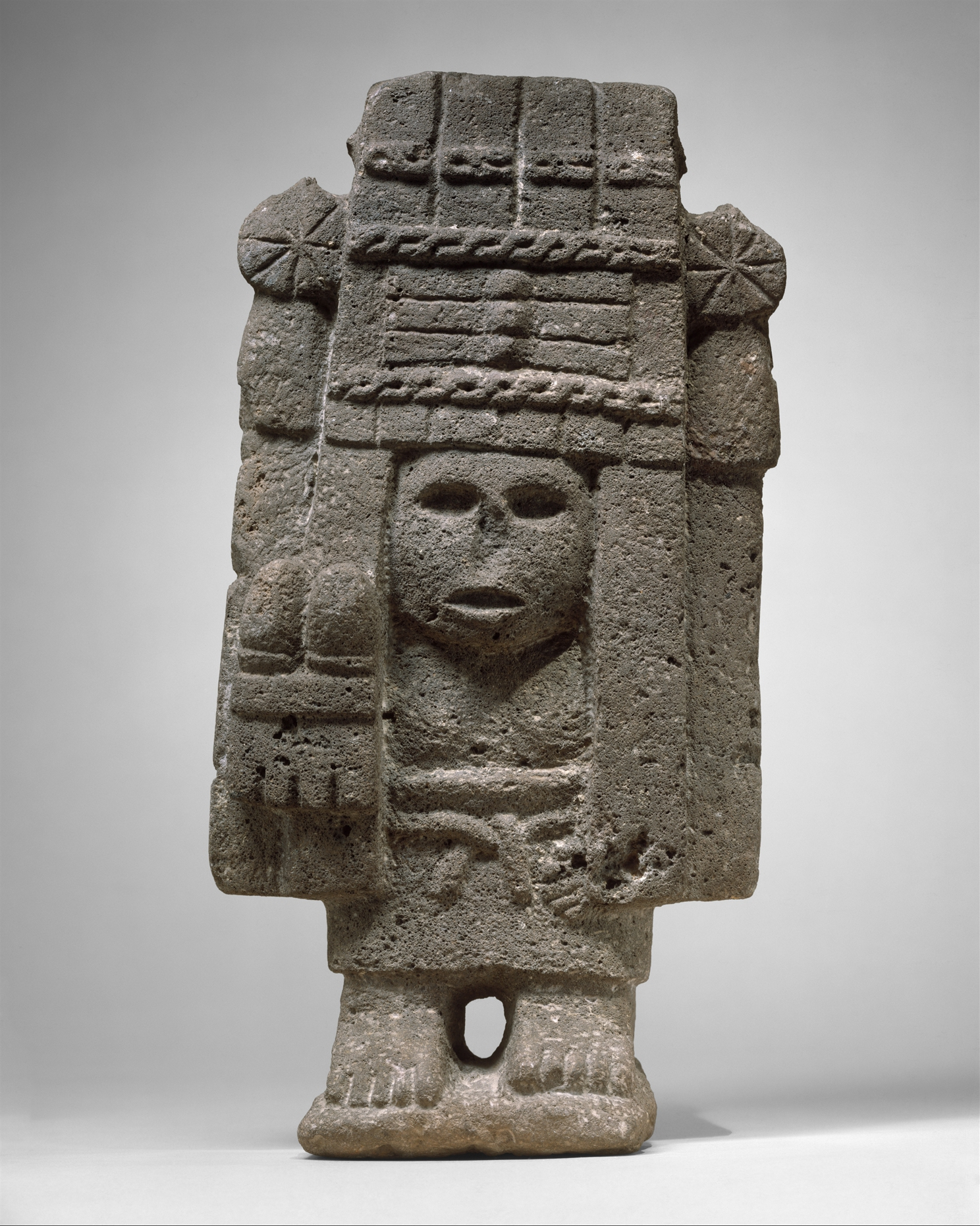
Maize Deity (Chicomecoatl), basalt

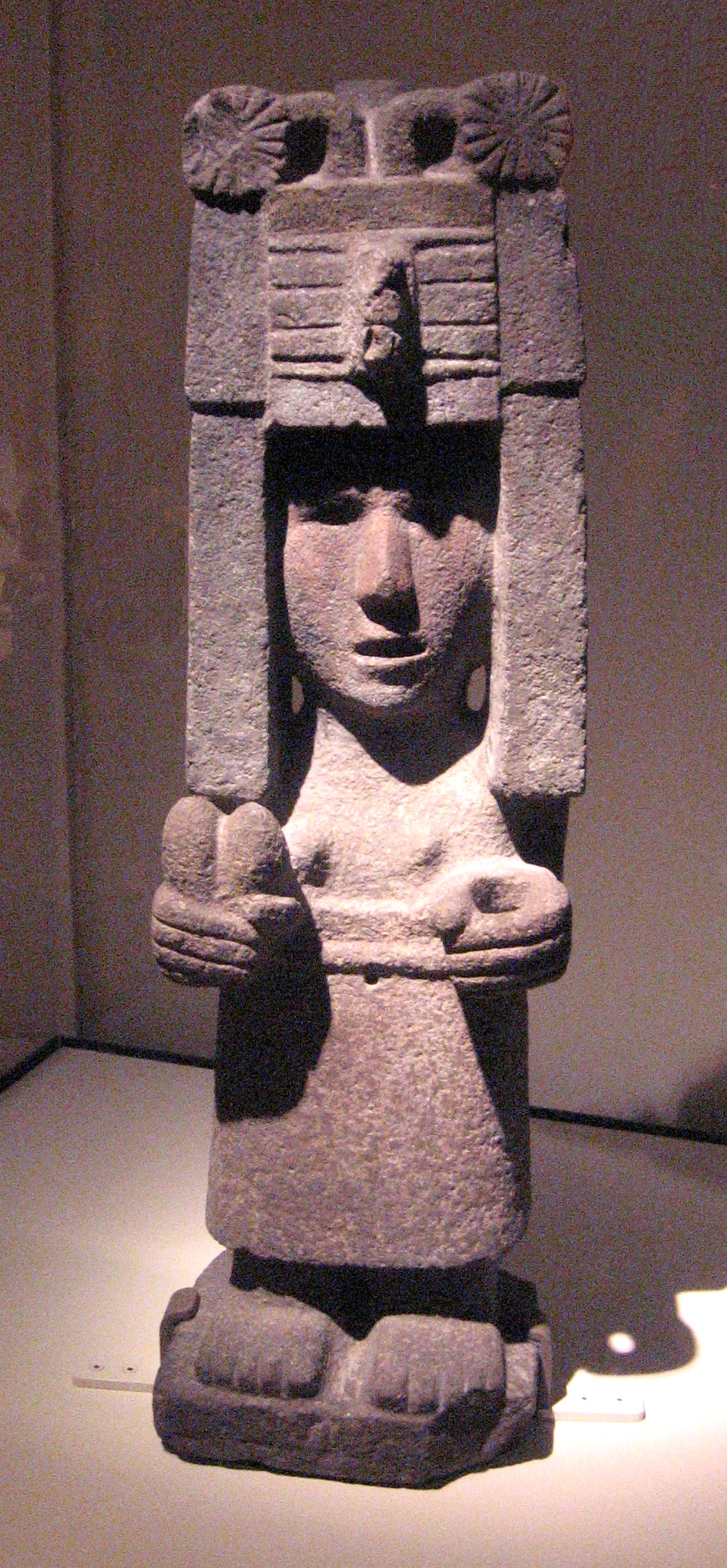
(Museo Nacional de Antropologia)

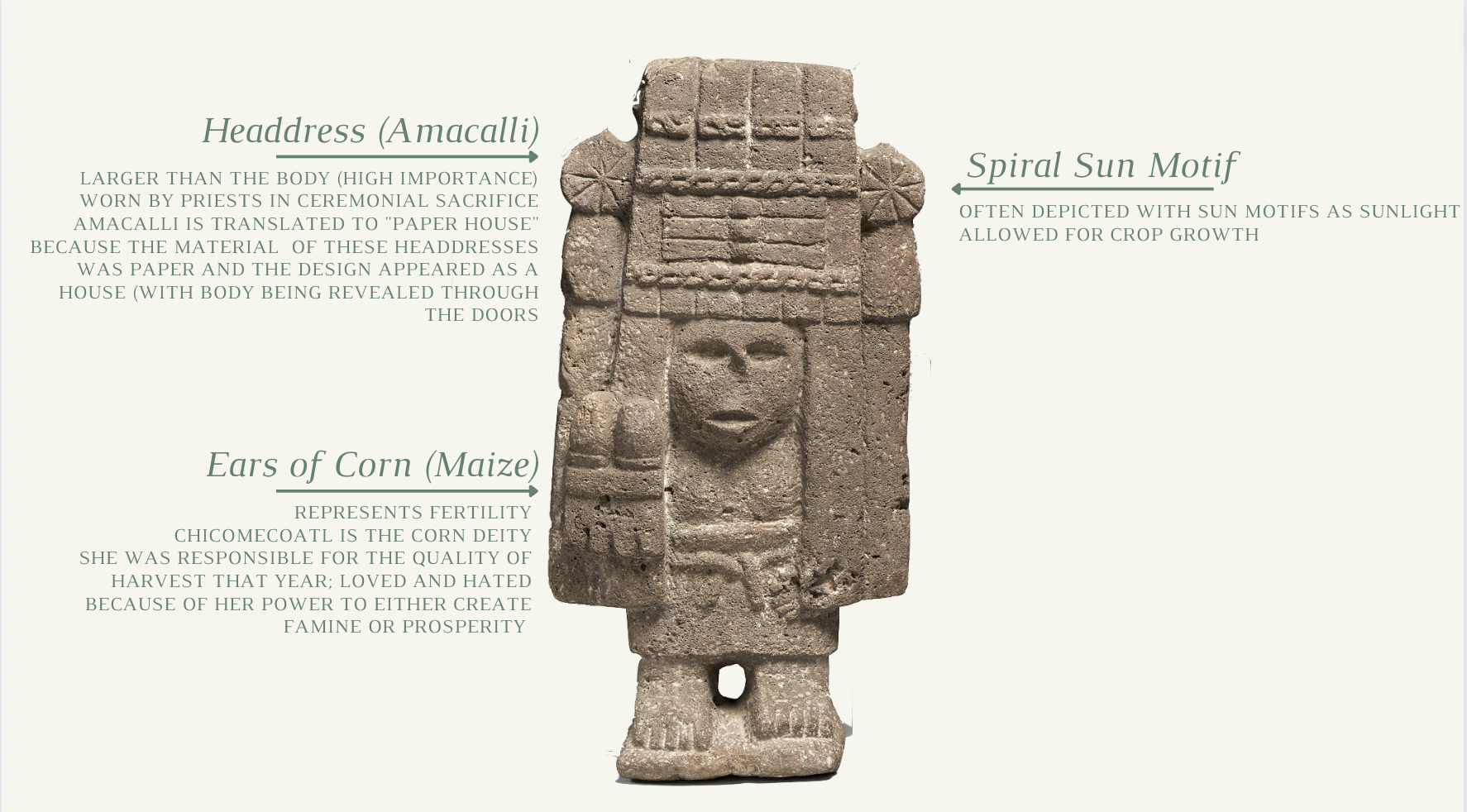
An annotation highlighting the main iconographic features of the Aztec deity, Chicomecoatl, based on the features present on the 15th–early 16th-century basalt statue from the Metropolitan Museum of Art.

== Festivals ==
She is particularly recognized during Huey Tozoztli, the first of sequence of three festivals held in high season marking the harvest. During the festival, her priestesses designate seed corn that is to be planted in the coming season. To appease the deity, as well as to ask for good harvest, priests often engaged in child sacrifice. Dried seed maize, harvested and retained for the following year, bore the title Chicomecōātl, while maize consumed following harvest season was generally referred to as Cinteotl.

== See also ==
- Centeōtl (Aztec god of maize)
- Maya maize god
