= Centeōtl =

God of maize in Aztec mythology

- God of maize
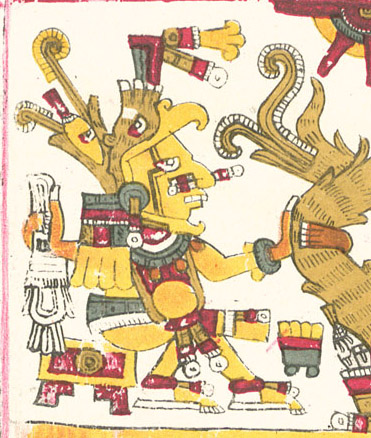
- Centeōtl in the Codex Borgia
- Other names: Cinteōtl
- Abode: Tlalticpac
- Symbol: Maize
- Gender: Male
- Region: Mesoamerica
- Ethnic group: Aztec (Nahua)

Genealogy
- Parents: Piltzintecuhtli and Xōchiquetzal (Codex Zumarraga); Piltzintecuhtli and Tlazōlteōtl (Florentine Codex)
- Siblings: None
- Consort: Chicomecōātl; Xōchiquetzal (Codex Le Tellier)
- Children: None

Equivalents
- Maya: Yum'Kaax (God E)
- Mixtec: Ñuhu-Cohuy
- Zapotec: Pitao-Cozobi

In Aztec mythology, Centeōtl [senˈteoːt͡ɬ], also known as Centeōcihuātl or Cinteōtl, is the maize deity. Cintli [ˈsint͡ɬi] means "dried maize still on the cob" and teōtl [ˈteoːt͡ɬ] means "deity". According to the Florentine Codex, Centeōtl is the son of the earth goddess Tlazōlteōtl and solar deity Piltzintecuhtli, the planet Mercury. He was born on the day-sign 1 Xōchitl. Another myth claims him as the son of the goddess Xōchiquetzal. The majority of evidence gathered on Centeōtl suggests that he is usually portrayed as a young man (although a debate is still ongoing), with yellow body colouration. Some specialists believe that Centeōtl used to be the maize goddess Chicomecōātl. Centeōtl was considered one of the most important deities of the Aztec era. There are many standard features shared in depictions of Centeōtl. For example, there often seems to be maize in his headdress. Another striking trait is the black line running down his eyebrow, through his cheek, and ending at the bottom of his jawline. These face markings are similarly and frequently used in the late post-classic depictions of the 'foliated' Maya maize god.

== Controversy ==
According to sources, Cinteotl is the god of maize and subsistence and Centeōtl corresponds to Chicomecōātl, the goddess of agriculture.

== Worship ==
In the Tōnalpōhualli, a 260-day sacred calendar used by many ancient Mesoamerican cultures, Centeōtl is the Lord of the Day for days numbered seven and the fourth Lord of the Night. In Aztec religion, maize (which was called Cintli in Nahuatl) was brought to this world by Quetzalcōātl and it is associated with the group of stars known commonly today as the Pleiades.

At the beginning of the year (most likely around February), Aztec workers would plant the young maize. These young maize plants potentially were used as symbolism for a pretty goddess, most likely Chicomecōātl, Princess of the Unripe Maize. Chicomecōātl is usually depicted carrying fresh maize in her hands, bare-breasted, and sitting down modestly. Some historians believe Chicomecōātl, otherwise known as "the hairy one", and Centeōtl are the same deity. When the seeds were planted, a ritual dance was performed to thank Mother Earth and, more specifically, Centeōtl. These dances became increasingly more prominent as the warmth of the sun brought about great prosperity for the Aztecs in the form of sprouting maize canes. A major custom during this festival period was for Nahua women, regardless of marital status, to loosen their ponchos and let down their hair. They would proceed to dance bare-breasted in the maize fields to thank Centeōtl for his work. Then each woman would pick five ears of corn from the field and bring them back in a grand procession while singing and dancing. Women in these processions were the promises of food and life. Traditionally, massive fights would then break out as people tried to soak one another in flower pollen or scented maize flour. Flower petals were also ceremonially thrown over people carrying ears of corn.

Maize was essential to Aztec life. The importance of Centeōtl cannot be overlooked. Countless historical sources show that much of the maize cultivated by the Aztecs was used in sacrifices to the gods. Usually, at least five newly ripened maize cobs were picked by the older Aztec women. These were then carried on their backs, carefully wrapped like newborns. Once the cobs reached their destination, usually outside a house, they were placed in a special corn basket and would stay there until the following year. This was meant to represent the maize spirits resting until the next harvesting period.

These five cobs were also symbols for a seemingly separate goddess. This highly worshipped goddess was known as Lady Chicomecōātl, Seven Serpents. She was the earth spirit and the lady of fertility and life, seen as a kind of mother figure in the Aztec world and was the partner of Centeōtl.

== Gallery ==
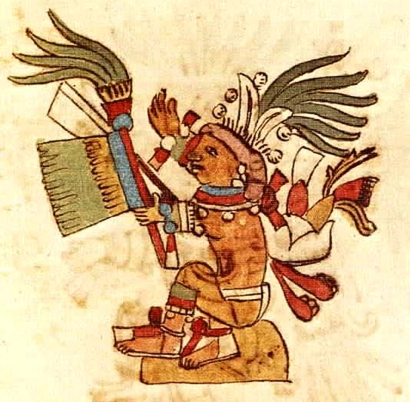
Centeōtl as depicted in a Codex

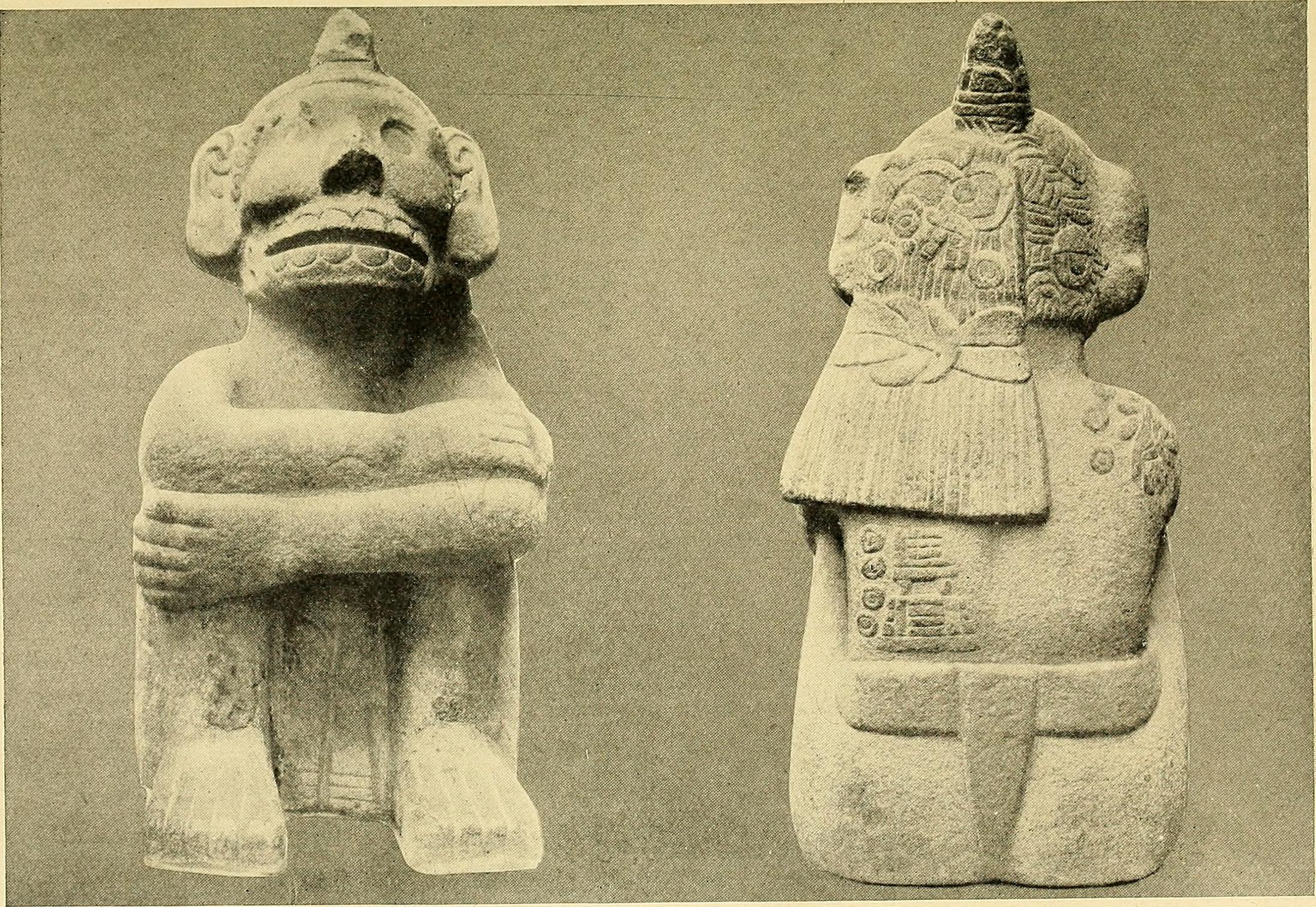
Photo from The myths of Mexico and Peru published 1902

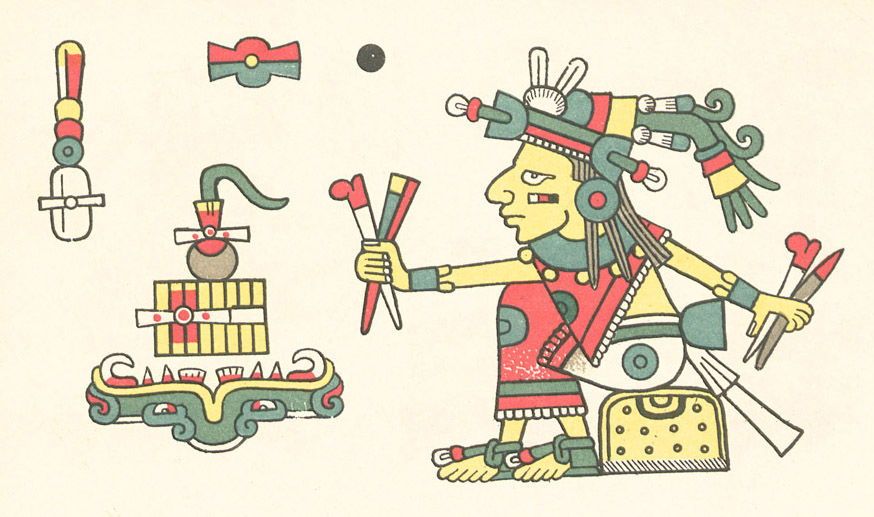
Cinteotl, dieu du maïs, devant le royaume des morts (Codex Fejérváry-Mayer, page 11)

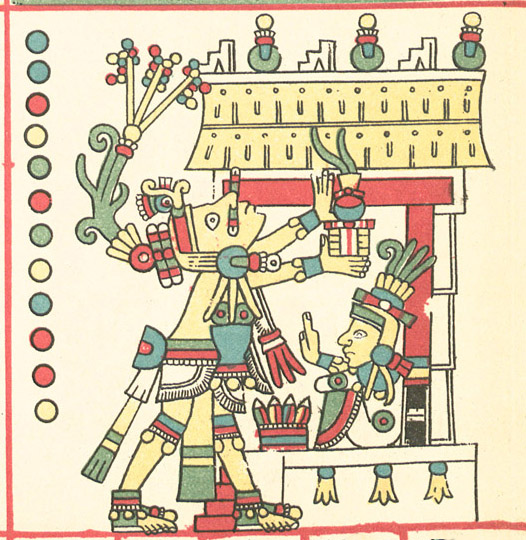
Cinteotl, dieu du maïs (Codex Fejérváry-Mayer, page 34)

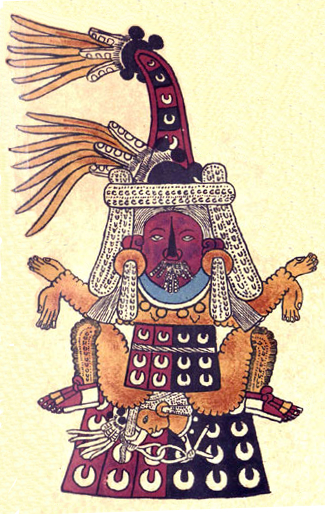
Page 13 of the Codex Borbonicus with Tlazōlteōtl, who is portrayed wearing a flayed skin, giving birth to Cinteotl

== See also ==
- Maya maize god
- Chicomecōātl, Aztec goddess of maize)
