= Fifth World =

Fifth World may refer to:

- Fifth World (comics), the successor to Jack Kirby's Fourth World in DC Comics
- Fifth World (mythology), Native American mythology

== See also ==
- World
- Other numbered "worlds":
  - First World
  - Second World
  - Third World
  - Third World (disambiguation)
  - Fourth World
  - Fourth World (disambiguation)
  - Sixth World
