= Tlālchitōnatiuh =

Tlalchitonatiuh (Classical Nahuatl: tlālchitōnatiuh; "sun of the red earth" or "red sun of the earth", from tlālli, earth, soil; chīltic, red; tōnatiuh or tōnatih, sun) was a Mesoamerican deity associated with the setting sun, when the stars start to appear in the night sky. Tlalchitonatiuh was worshipped among many Mesoamerican cultures including Mayans, but originated from the Toltec civilization.

Along with Xolotl, Tlalchitonatiuh reigned in the sixteenth trecena of the Tonalpohualli. According to Codex Ríos, he is represented symbolically as a young man with the sun over his shoulders and death and darkness beneath his feet, representing the setting sun. In the Borgia Codex Tlalchitonatiuh was represented as Tlalchitecuhtli devouring the solar mortuary bag.

== See also ==
- Tonatiuh
