= Tōnatiuh =

Aztec deity of the sun and of the cardinal direction of east

- Sun deity of the daytime sky and ruled the cardinal direction of east
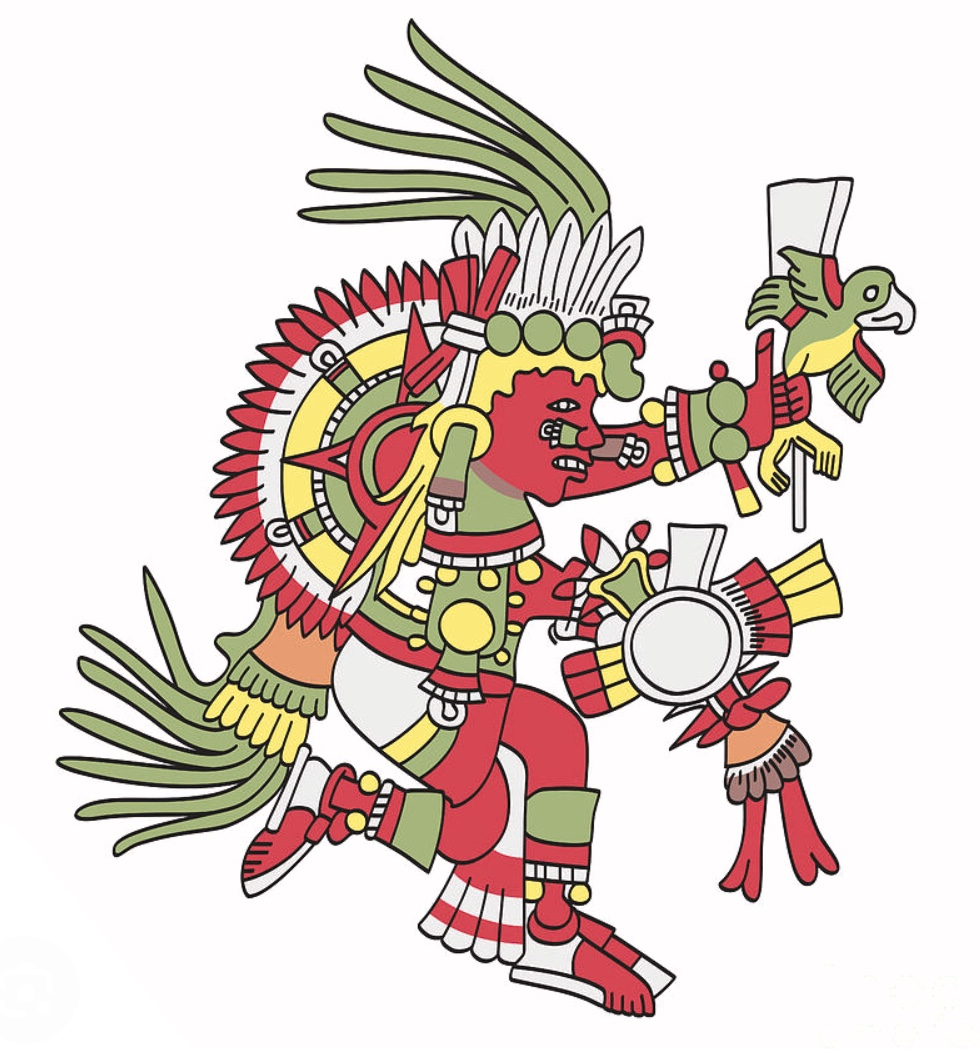
- Tōnatiuh as depicted in the Codex Telleriano-Remensis
- Abode: Sky
- Symbol: Sun, Eagle
- Gender: Agender
- Region: Mesoamerica
- Ethnic group: Aztec (Nahua)

Genealogy
- Siblings: Quetzalcoatl
- Consort: None
- Children: None

Equivalents
- Maya: Kinich Ahau
- Zapotec: Pitao Copiycha

In Mesoamerican culture, Tonatiuh (Nahuatl languages: Tōnatiuh [toːˈnatiʍ] "Movement of the Sun") is an Aztec sun deity of the daytime sky who rules the cardinal direction of east. According to Aztec mythology, Tonatiuh was known as "The Fifth Sun" and was given a calendar name of naui olin, which means "4 Movement". Represented as a fierce and warlike god, he is first seen in Early Postclassic art of the Pre-Columbian civilization known as the Toltec. Tonatiuh's symbolic association with the eagle alludes to the Aztec belief of his journey as the present sun, travelling across the sky each day, where he descended in the west and ascended in the east. It was thought that his journey was sustained by the daily sacrifice of humans. His Nahuatl name can also be translated to "He Who Goes Forth Shining" or "He Who Makes The Day". Tonatiuh was thought to be the central deity on the Aztec calendar stone but is no longer identified as such. In Toltec culture, Tonatiuh is often associated with Quetzalcoatl in his manifestation as the morning star aspect of the planet Venus.

== Creation myths ==
There are several versions of Tonatiuh's birth as a sun deity in the Aztec creation myth. The Aztecs (also known as the Mexica) believed in a number of sun gods. According to their mythology, Earth and its beings had been created five times in five cosmic eras and were ruled by five different sun gods. When each era or eon had ended and the sun god and its beings had been destroyed, the gods were to choose a new sun God. The four suns that preceded Tonatiuh were called "4 Jaguar", "4 Wind", "4 Water", and "4 Rain." Each of the four eras and its beings had been destroyed by an element simultaneously named after its sun god: the beings in 4 Jaguar (giants) were consumed by jaguars; the beings in 4 Wind (monkeys) were destroyed by great winds; the beings in 4 Water were consumed by water; the being in 4 Rain (turkeys) were killed by rains of fire. The first two eras lasted for 676 years, while the third era lasted for 364 years.

Tonatiuh's era was known as "the fifth age". In a myth called "The Primal Sun Myth", Tonatiuh's appearance as the fifth and final sun took place in the Pre-Columbian Mesoamerican city of Teotihuacan. According to the myth, in order for Tonatiuh to rise a substantial sacrifice had to be made. Despite the voluntary self-sacrifices from the Aztec gods Nanahuatl (or Nanahuatzin), a deformed and pimpled deity, and Teucciztecatl, Tonatiuh refused to rise and did not ascend until the canine god Xolotl sacrificed himself. In this particular account, it is said that it was the bravery of Nanahuatl that resulted in Tonatiuh's rise and that Teucciztecatl became the moon because of his hesitation before sacrificing himself.

Various accounts of the creation myth portray different narratives. According to an account by Franciscan missionary Bernardino de Sahagún, following the sacrifices of Nanahuatl and Teucciztecatl in a great fire, Tonatiuh rose weakly and did not move until the wind god Ehecatl (also known as Quetzalcoatl or called Ehecatl-Quetzalcoatl) executed Xolotl and blew Tonatiuh into motion. The telling of this version of the creation of the fifth sun was captured in a text that read:

And they say that, even though all the gods died, In truth, still he did not move. (It was) not possible for the Sun, Tonatiuh, To follow his path. In this way, Ehecatl did his work. Ehecatl stood up straight. He grew extremely strong. He ran and blew lightly. Instantly, he moved (the sun). Like so, he follows his path.

It is also suggested that Tonatiuh is the transfigured version of Nanahuatl. In his recorded writings of the fifth sun's creation, Bernardino de Sahagún mentions that the gods were waiting for Nanahuatl to appear as the sun:

When both of them had been consumed by this great fire, the gods sat down to await the reappearance of Nanahuatzin; where, they wondered, would he appear. Their waiting was long. Suddenly the sky turned red; everywhere the light of dawn appeared. It is said that the gods then knelt to await the rising of Nanahuatzin as the Sun. All about them they looked, but they were unable to guess where he would appear.

== Representations and iconographic depictions ==
=== Aztec calendar stone ===
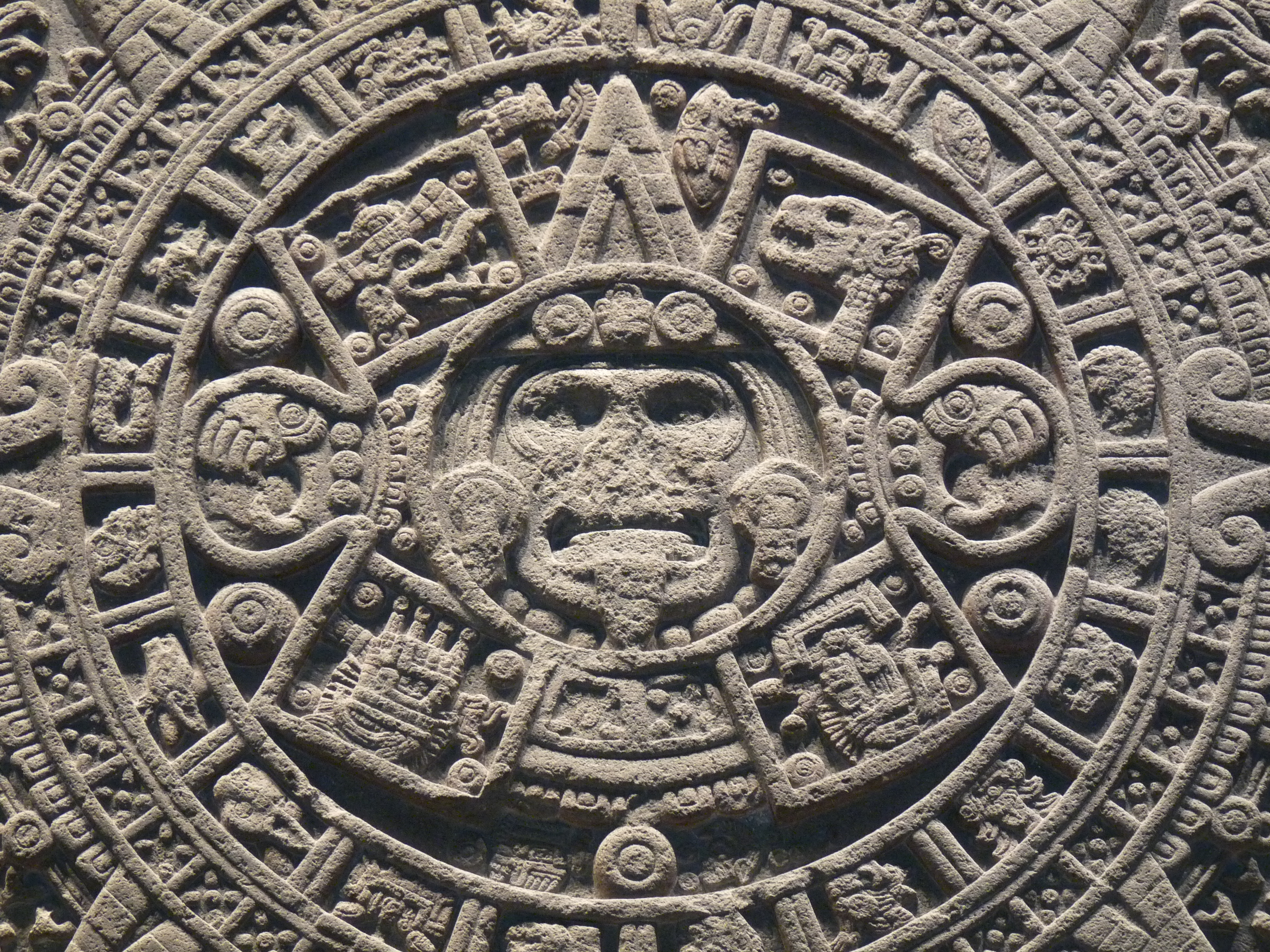
The Aztec sun stone.

Early Pre-Columbian scholars have long identified Tonatiuh as the central deity of the Aztec calendar stone. Various scholarships, however, believe the face at the centre of the stone to be that of the earth monster Tlaltecuhtli. Tlaltecuhtli is often depicted in Aztec art with an open mouth and a sacrificial knife known as a "flint" representing a tongue. While the inner ring of the stone contains the glyph "4 Movement", it is flanked by four square compartments. These compartments and their glyphs are believed to represent the four cosmic eras prior to Tonatiuh as the fifth sun and the documentation of when each era was destroyed. Some scholars maintain the view that Tlaltecuhtli signifies the destruction of the present or fifth era by earthquakes, a view relevant to the same Aztec belief.

=== Physical appearance ===
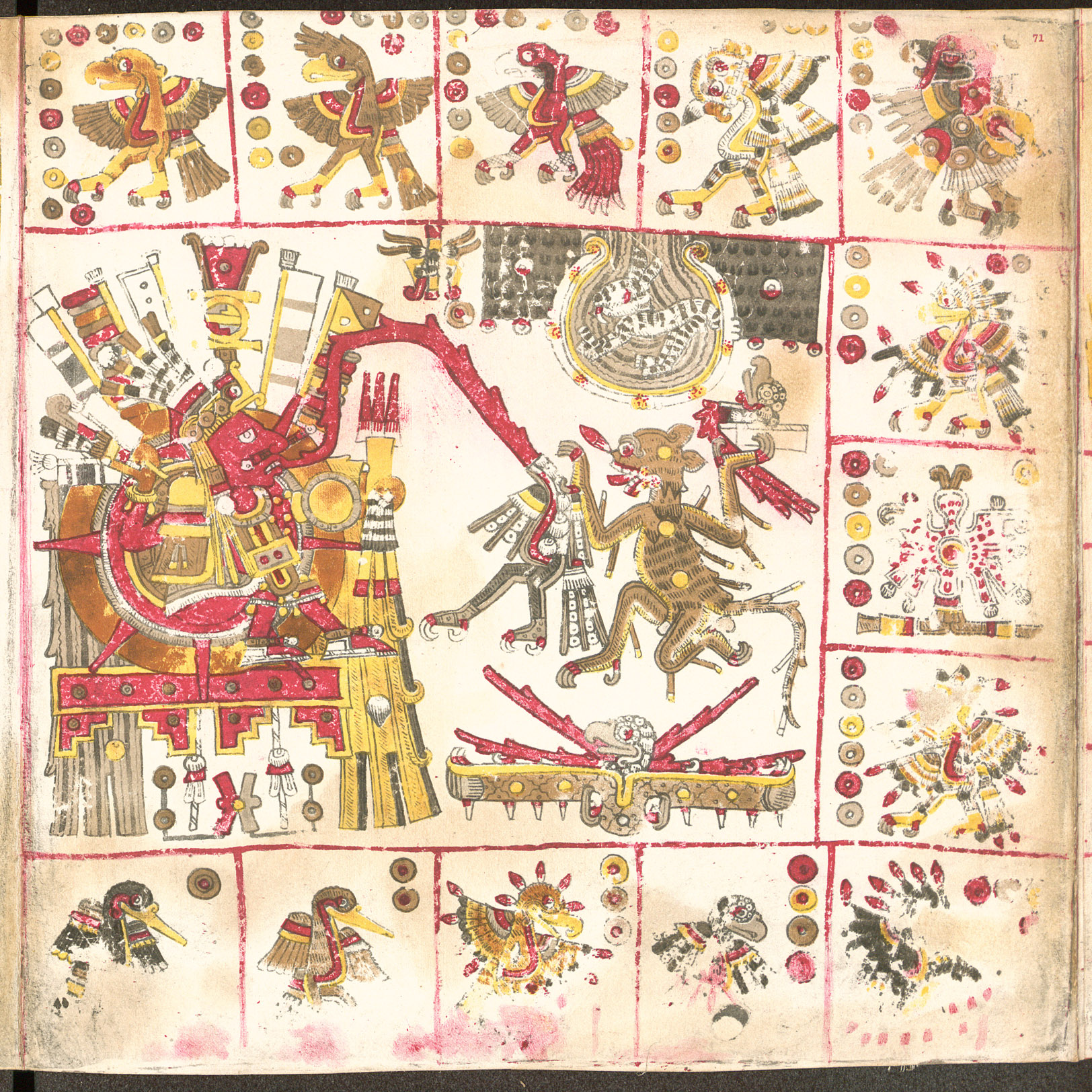
Codex Borgia page 71 depicts Tonatiuh (left).

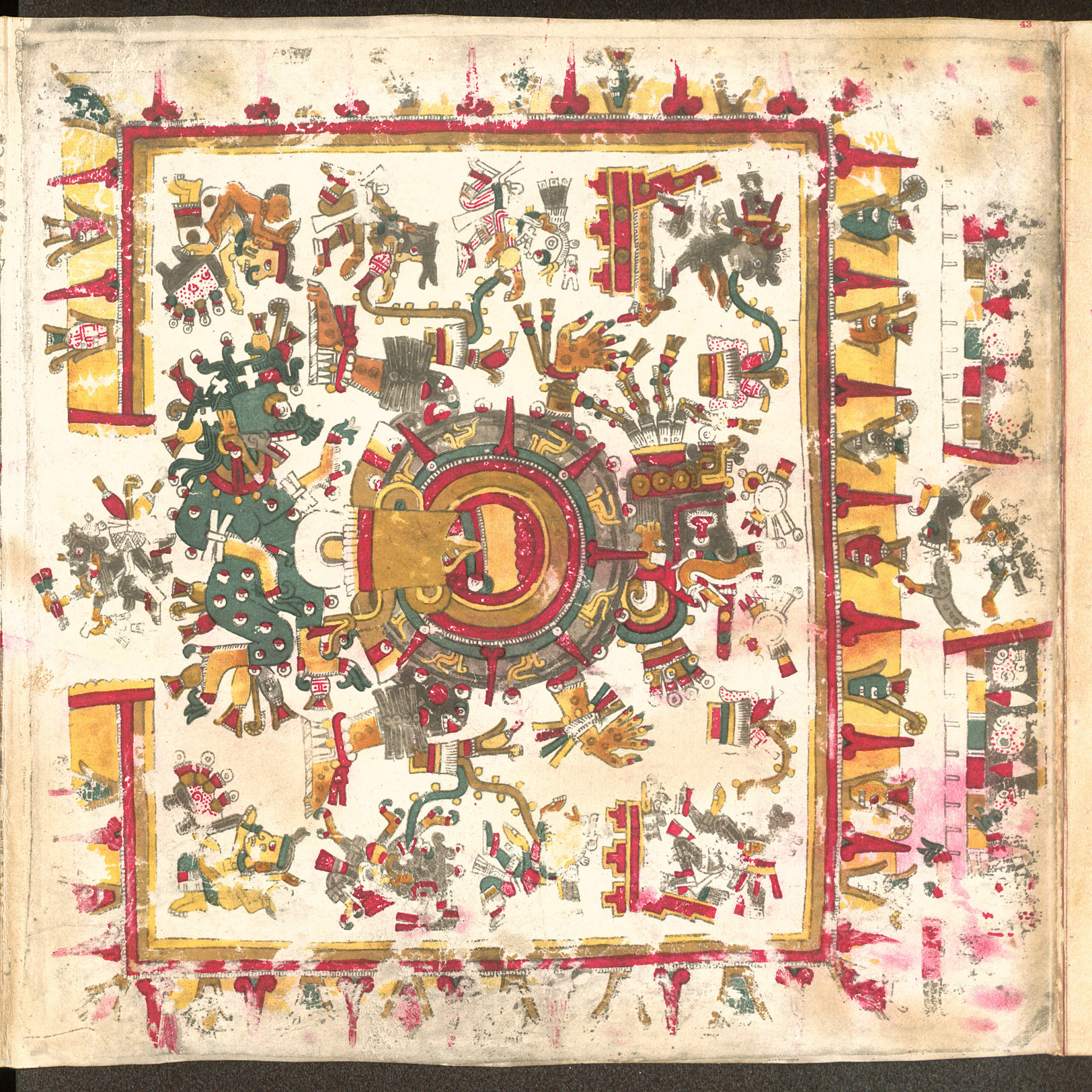
Codex Borgia page 43 depicts Tonatiuh with the canine features of Xolotl.

The iconography of Tonatiuh's physical appearance provides a visual explanation of his role as a sun deity. In certain depictions, Tonatiuh is painted in the colour red and is seen wearing an eagle feather headdress, holding a shield that could be a solar disc. Tonatiuh's connection to the sun relates to the belief that the eagle is a reference to the ascending and descending eagle talons, a visual metaphor for capturing the heart or life force of a person. This particular form of symbolism points to ritual of human sacrifice, which was associated with Tonatiuh and his devouring of the hearts of victims.

== Belief in Alvarado as Tonatiuh ==
During the Spanish Conquest in the sixteenth Century, the Aztecs referred to the Spanish explorer and conquistador Pedro de Alvarado as Tonatiuh. Alvarado was said to be violent and aggressive and had a red beard, reminding them of their sun-god warrior (often painted red) Tonatiuh. In a translation of his writings, the Spanish conquistador Bernal Díaz del Castillo speaks of the Aztec's reference to Alvarado as "the Sun". Castillo describes Alvarado and Hernán Cortés meeting the Aztec ruler, Moctezuma II and being accompanied by his men, an encounter which includes a description of Alvarado's features:

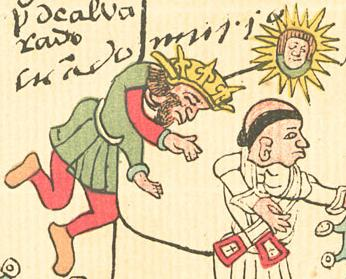
The death of Alvarado in the Codex Telleriano-Remensis (16th century). The sun glyph of Tonatiuh is joined to him.

The ambassadors with whom they were travelling gave an account of their doings to Montezuma, and he ask them what sort of faces and general appearance had these two Teules who were coming to Mexico, and whether they were Captains, and it seems that they replied that Pedro de Alvarado was of very perfect grade both in face and person, that he looked like the Sun, and that he was a Captain, and in addition to this they brought with them a picture of him with his face very naturally portrayed and from that time forth they gave him the title of Tonatio, which means the Sun or the Child of the Sun, and so they called him ever after.

== See also ==
- Aztec calendar stone
- Five Suns
- List of solar deities
- Tlālchitōnatiuh
