= Fourth World (disambiguation) =

Fourth World refers to a sub-population subjected to social exclusion in global society, or stateless and notably impoverished or marginalized nations.

Fourth World may also refer to:

== Publications ==
- Fourth World (comics), created by Jack Kirby at DC Comics in the early 1970s
- Fourth World trilogy of novels by Kate Thompson
- The Fourth World (novel) by Dennis Danvers

== Music ==
- Fourth World (band), Brazilian musical group

=== Albums ===
- Fourth World (album), by the Brazilian group Fourth World, 1993
- Fourth World, Vol. 1: Possible Musics, album by Jon Hassell and Brian Eno, 1980
- The Fourth World (album), the debut studio album by Kara's Flowers, later known as Maroon 5, 1997

== Other uses ==
- The Fourth World of the Diné Bahaneʼ Navajo creation story

== See also ==
- Four Worlds
- The fourth part of the world (disambiguation)
- First World
- Second World
- Third World
- Fifth World (disambiguation)
- Sixth World
- Unrepresented Nations and Peoples Organization
- Developing countries
