= Four corners of the world (disambiguation) =

Four corners of the world is a portrayal of the four compass points in several cosmological and mythological systems.

Four corners of the world may also refer to:

- Four continents, a 16th-century European view of the globe
- 4 Corners of the World, label on the logo of Four Corners Records
- The Four Corners of the World, a 1917 short-story collection by A. E. W. Mason
- Ad quattuor cardines mundi ("to the four corners of the earth"), motto of St Cross College, Oxford
- Four Corners of the World, a 1958 album by Juan García Esquivel
- Four Corners Of The World, Chapter 098 of DJ Screw's official Screwtape mixtape series
- The Four Corners of the World, a musical work for brass ensembles by Ronald Hanmer
- "The Four Corners Of The Earth", a song on the 1992 album Difficult Loves by Weddings Parties Anything
- "At the Four Corners of the Earth", a track on the 1997 album The Divine Wings of Tragedy by Symphony X

== See also ==
- Four Corners (disambiguation)
- The fourth part of the world (disambiguation)
