= Five Suns =

Creation Legend of the Aztecs

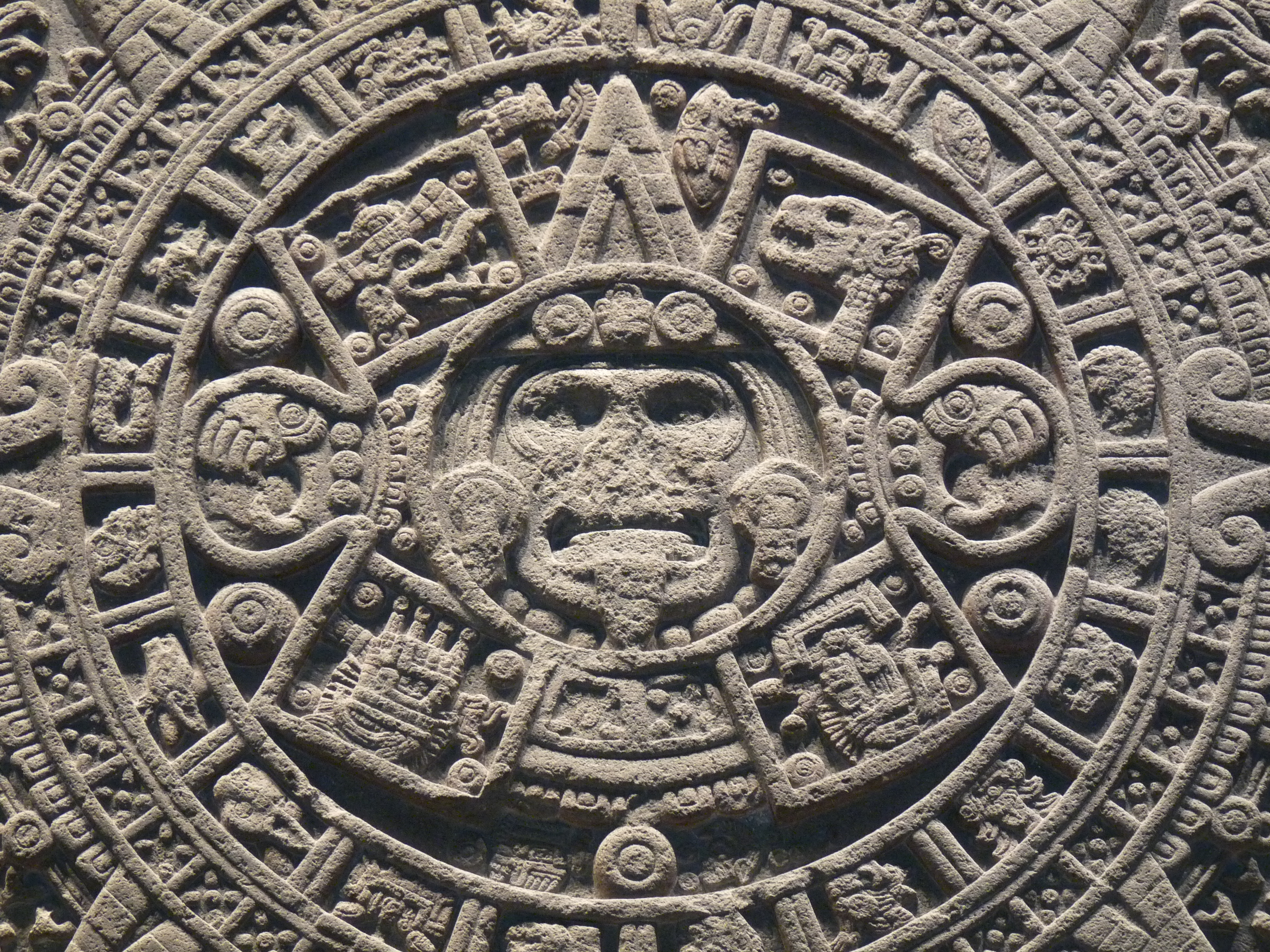
The Aztec sun stone.

In creation myths, the term "Five Suns" refers to the belief of certain Nahua cultures and Aztec peoples that the world has gone through five distinct cycles of creation and destruction, with the current era being the fifth. It is primarily derived from a combination of myths, cosmologies, and eschatological beliefs that were originally held by pre-Columbian peoples in the Mesoamerican region, including central Mexico, and it is part of a larger mythology of Fifth World or Fifth Sun beliefs.

The late Postclassic Aztecs created and developed their own version of the "Five Suns" myth, which incorporated and transformed elements from previous Mesoamerican creation myths, while also introducing new ideas that were specific to their culture.

In the Aztec and other Nahua creation myths, it was believed that the universe had gone through four iterations before the current one, and each of these prior worlds had been destroyed by Gods due to the behavior of its inhabitants.

The current world is a product of the Aztecs' self-imposed mission to provide Tlazcaltiliztli to the sun, giving it the nourishment it needs to stay in existence and ensuring that the entire universe remains in balance. Thus, the Aztecs’ sacrificial rituals were essential to the functioning of the world, and ultimately to its continued survival.

== Legend ==
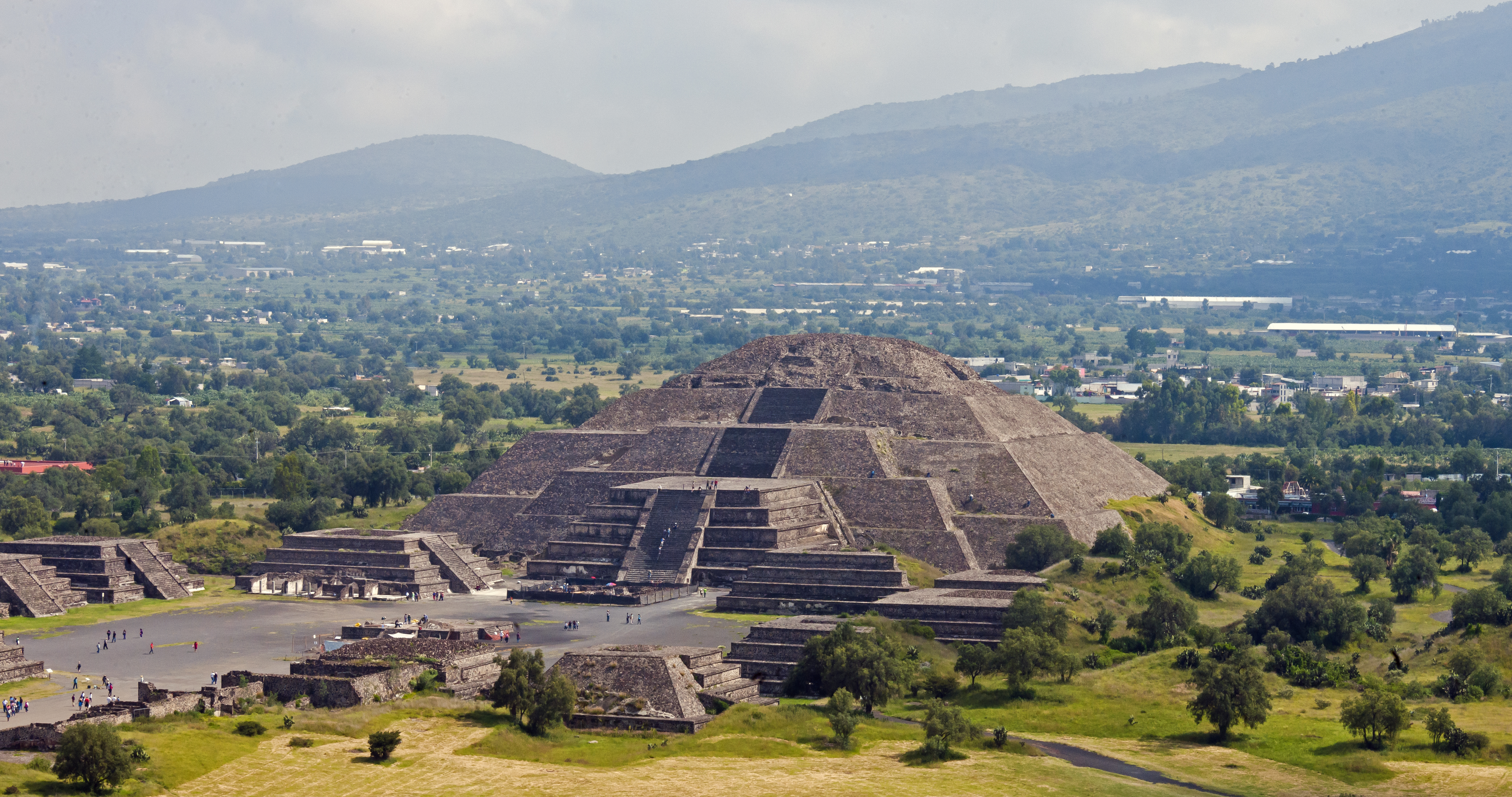
Teotihuacan, the "birthplace of the gods".

According to the legend, from the void that was the rest of the universe, the first god, Ōmeteōtl, created itself. (Note: The nature of Ōmeteōtl, as the "God of duality", was sometimes divided into Ometecuhtli, "Lord of duality," and Omecihuatl, "Lady of duality".) Ōmeteōtl created the four Tezcatlipocas, who each preside over one of the four cardinal directions: Quetzalcoatl in the west, Huitzilopochtli in the south, Xipe Totec in the east, and Tezcatlipoca in the north.

The Aztecs believed that the gods created the universe at Teotihuacan. The name Teōtīhuacān was given by the Nahuatl-speaking Aztecs centuries after the fall of the city around 550 CE. The term has been glossed as "birthplace of the gods", or "place where gods were born", reflecting Nahua creation myths that were said to occur in Teotihuacan.

=== First sun: Tezcatlipoca ===
The four Tezcatlipocas sought to create the world, but each time they created something, it fell into the waters below and was devoured by Cipactli, a monstrous caiman covered in mouths. Determined to end the cycle, Tezcatlipoca, the Black Tezcatlipoca, sacrificed his leg, using it as bait to lure Cipactli from the depths. As she consumed it, the other gods seized the opportunity to slay her. From her body, they shaped the earth, and later created other gods and humans, the latter giants in size.

To provide light, they chose Tezcatlipoca to be the sun. However, whether due to the loss of his leg in battle or his role as the god of night, he could only shine as half a sun. The world existed under this dim light for a time, until a confrontation with Quetzalcōātl saw him knock Tezcatlipoca out the sky, with a stone club, and leaving the world in darkness. Angered by his defeat, Tezcatlipoca sent his jaguars to consume humanity.

=== Second sun: Quetzalcōātl ===
The gods shaped a new race of humans in normal stature, with Quetzalcōātl serving as the sun for this new civilization. The people, called Maceguales, ate only pine-nuts. This lasted for 676 years, until Quetzalcōātl was kicked by Tezcatlipoca, causing Quetzalcōātl great distress. Then a great wind came upon the earth, and blew away the Maceguales; the survivors of whom were transformed into monkeys. After this, Tlaloc became the next sun.

=== Third sun: Tlaloc ===
Tlaloc was crowned the new sun. During the third sun, the humans had nothing to eat but açiçiutli, a type of seed. This state of affairs lasted for 364 years, until Quetzalcōātl sent down a rain of fire. Tlaloc was replaced with his own wife, Chalchiuhtlicue, who became the new sun.

=== Fourth sun: Chalchiuhtlicue ===
Chalchiuhtlicue, the water goddess, acted as the fourth sun for 312 years. In the final year, there was a great flood which drowned the Earth. All humans of the Fourth Sun became fish.

=== Fifth sun: Huītzilōpōchtli ===
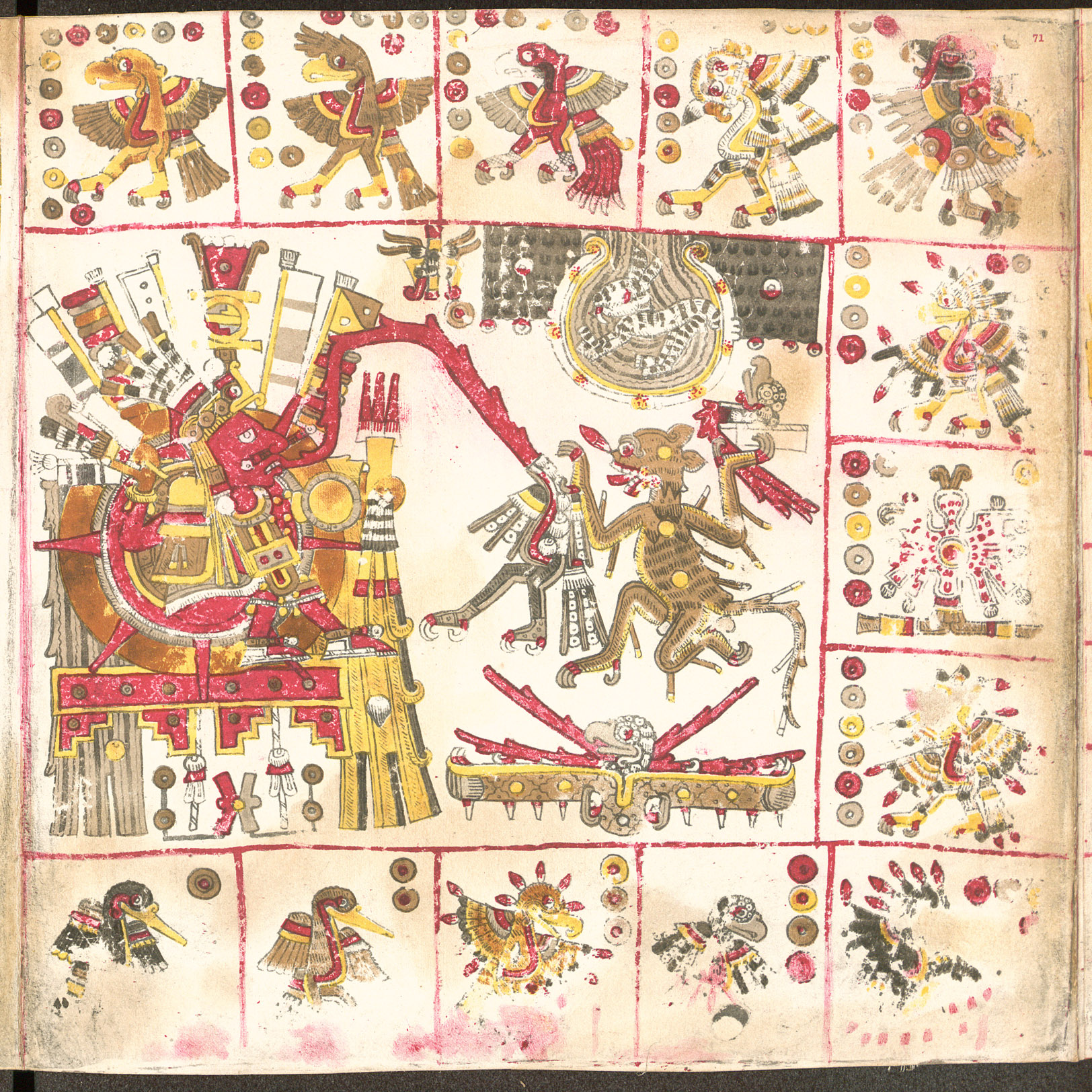
Codex Borgia page 71 depicts Tonatiuh "The Fifth Sun", and Metzli.

Unwilling to accept the destruction of his people, Quetzalcōātl descended into the underworld and stole their bones from Mictlāntēcutli, ruler of the dead. As he carried them back to the earth, he tripped and fell into a hole, shattering the bones. When the remains were dipped in Quetzalcoatl’s blood, they were restored, but their broken state resulted in humans being born in different sizes. Huītzilōpōchtli was then chosen as the new sun.

However, Huītzilōpōchtli was locked in an eternal battle with his sister, the moon Coyolxāuhqui, who led an assault against him each night. She was aided by the Centzonhuītznāhua, the southern stars, and the Tzitzimīmeh, goddesses of the solar eclipse. Yet despite their efforts, they were always defeated by Huītzilōpōchtli at dawn.

To sustain his strength, the Aztecs offer human sacrifices, while also sacrificing to Tezcatlipoca out of fear and giving their own blood to Quetzalcōātl, who opposes fatal offerings. Should these tributes cease, the fifth sun will go dark, the world will crumble in a great earthquake, and Huitzilopochtli will be defeated, bringing an end to humanity.

== Variations and alternative myths ==
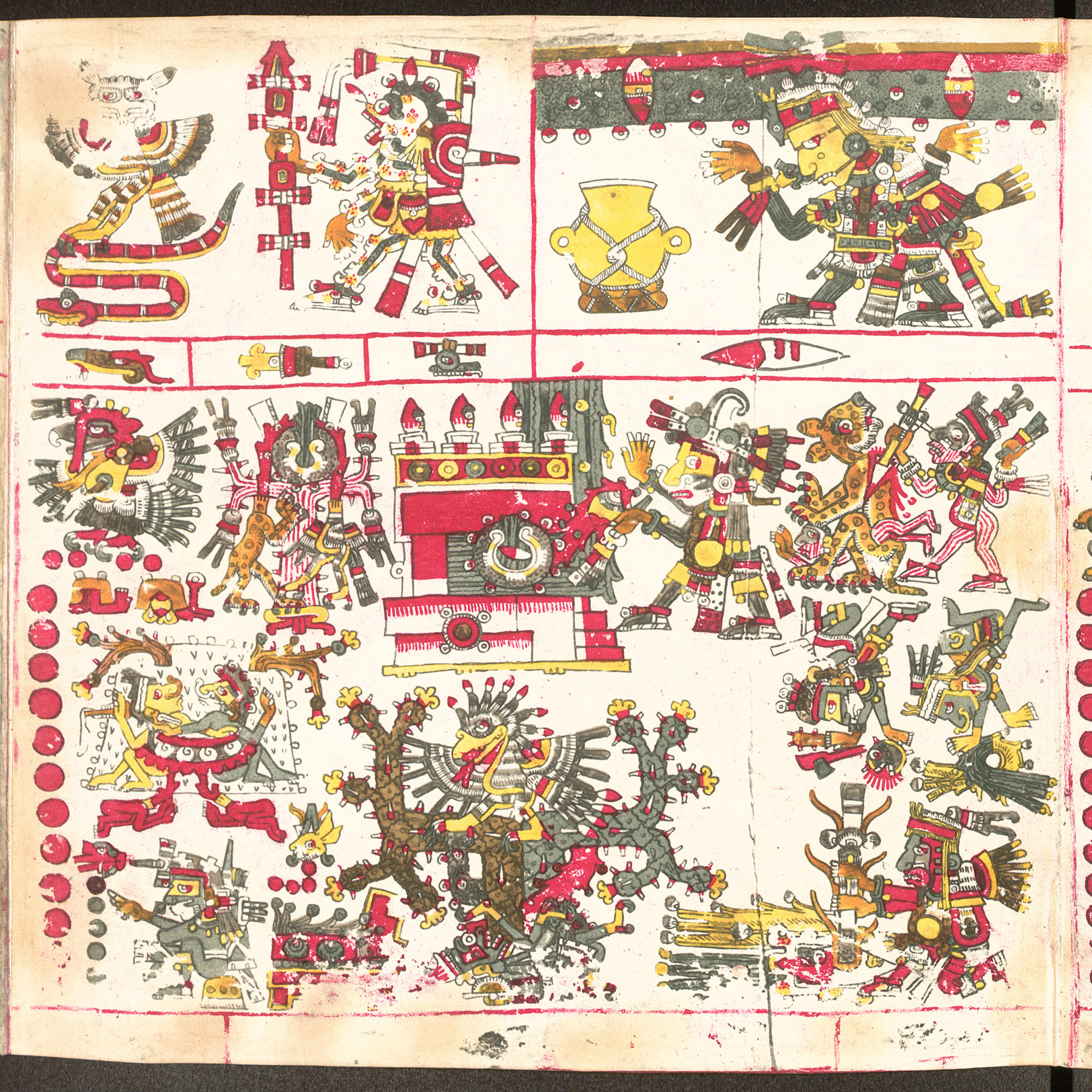
Huitzilopochtli is raising up the skies of the South, one of the four directions of the world, surrounded by their respective trees, temples, patterns, and divination symbols.

Most of what is known about the ancient Aztecs comes from the few codices to survive the Spanish conquest. Their myths can be confusing because of the lack of documentation and also because there are many popular myths that seem to contradict one another. This happened due to the fact that they were originally passed down by word of mouth and because the Aztecs adopted many of their gods from other tribes, both assigning their own new aspects to these gods and endowing them with those of similar gods from various other cultures. Older myths can be very similar to newer myths while contradicting one another by claiming that a different god performed the same action, probably because myths changed in correlation to the popularity of each of the gods at a given time.

Other variations on this myth state that Coatlicue, the earth goddess, was the mother of the four Tezcatlipocas and the Tzitzimitl. Some versions say that Quetzalcoatl was born to her first, while she was still a virgin, often mentioning his twin brother Xolotl, the guide of the dead and god of fire. Tezcatlipoca was then born to her by an obsidian knife, followed by the Tzitzimitl and then Huitzilopochtli. The most popular variation including Coatlicue depicts her giving birth first to the Tzitzimitl. Much later she gave birth to Huitzilopochtli when a mysterious ball of feathers appeared to her. The Tzitzimitl then decapitated the pregnant Coatlicue, believing it to be insulting that she had given birth to another child. Huitzilopochtli then sprang forth from her womb wielding a serpent of fire and began his epic war with the Tzitzimitl, who were also referred to as the Centzon Huitznahuas. Sometimes he is said to have decapitated Coyolxauhqui and either used her head to make the moon or thrown it into a canyon. Further variations depict the ball of feathers as being the father of Huitzilopochtli or the father of Quetzalcoatl and sometimes Xolotl.

Other variations of this myth claim that only Quetzalcoatl and Tezcatlipoca were born to Ometeotl, who was replaced by Coatlicue in this myth probably because it had absolutely no worshipers or temples by the time the Spanish arrived. It is sometimes said that the male characteristic of Ometeotl is named Ometecuhtli and that the female characteristic is named Omecihualt. Further variations on this myth state that it was only Quetzalcoatl and Tezcatlipoca who pulled apart Cipactli, also known as Tlaltecuhtli, and that Xipe Totec and Huitzilopochtli then constructed the world from her body. Some versions claim that Tezcatlipoca actually used his leg as bait for Cipactli, before dismembering her.

The order of the first four suns varies as well, though the above version is the most common. Each world's end correlates consistently to the god that was the sun at the time throughout all variations of the myth, though the loss of Xochiquetzal is not always identified as Tlaloc's reason for the rain of fire, which is not otherwise given and it is sometimes said that Chalchiuhtlicue flooded the world on purpose, without the involvement of Tezcatlipoca. It is also said that Tezcatlipoca created half a sun, which his jaguars then ate before eating the giants.

The fifth sun however is sometimes said to be a god named Nanauatzin. In this version of the myth, the gods convened in darkness to choose a new sun, who was to sacrifice himself by jumping into a gigantic bonfire. The two volunteers were the young son of Tlaloc and Chalchiuhtlicue, Tecuciztecatl, and the old Nanauatzin. It was believed that Nanauatzin was too old to make a good sun, but both were given the opportunity to jump into the bonfire. Tecuciztecatl tried first but was not brave enough to walk through the heat near the flames and turned around. Nanauatzin then walked slowly towards and then into the flames and was consumed. Tecuciztecatl then followed. The braver Nanauatzin became what is now the sun and Tecuciztecatl became the much less spectacular moon. A god that bridges the gap between Nanauatzin and Huitzilopochtli is Tonatiuh, who was sick, but rejuvenated himself by burning himself alive and then became the warrior sun and wandered through the heavens with the souls of those who died in battle, refusing to move if not offered enough sacrifices.

== Brief summation: Mythic ages of the Five Suns ==
Classical Nahua texts such as the Codex Chimalpopoca record five successive world-ages, each tied to the calendric day nāhui “four” plus a day-sign of the 260-day tonalpohualli.

Nahuatl day-name	Common English title	Catastrophe
Nāhui-Ocēlōtl	Age of Four-Jaguar (“Jaguar Sun”)	Giant humans were devoured by jaguars.
Nāhui-Ehecatl	Age of Four-Wind (“Wind Sun”)	Humans became monkeys and the age ended in destructive winds.
Nāhui-Quiyahuitl	Age of Four-Rain (“Rain Sun”)	A rain of fire destroyed the world; a few survivors turned into birds.
Nāhui-Ātl	Age of Four-Water (“Water Sun”)	A great flood ended the age; inhabitants were transformed into fish, with one couple becoming dogs.
Nāhui-Olīn	Age of Four-Movement (“Earthquake Sun” – current age)	Foretold to end in a massive earthquake and the return of the Tzitzimimeh.

== In popular culture ==
- The version of the myth with Nanahuatzin serves as a framing device for the 1991 Mexican film, In Necuepaliztli in Aztlan (Return a Aztlán), by Juan Mora Catlett.
- The version of the myth with Nanahuatzin is in the 1996 film, The Five Suns: A Sacred History of Mexico, by Patricia Amlin.
- Rage Against the Machine refers to intercultural violence as "the fifth sunset" in their song "People of the Sun", on the album Evil Empire.
- Thomas Harlan's science fiction series "In the Time of the Sixth Sun" uses this myth as a central plot point, where an ancient star-faring civilization ("people of the First Sun") had disappeared and left the galaxy with many dangerous artifacts.
- The Shadowrun role-playing game takes place in the "Sixth World."
- The concept of the five suns is alluded to in Onyx Equinox, where Quetzalcoatl claims that the gods made humanity four times before. Tezcatlipoca seeks to end the current human era, since he believes humans are too greedy and waste their blood in battle rather than as sacrifices.
- The final episode of Victor and Valentino is called "The Fall of the Fifth Sun", and also features Tezcatlipoca in a central role.

== See also ==
- Aztec mythology
- Aztec religion
- Aztec philosophy
- Fifth World (mythology)
- Mesoamerican creation accounts
- Sun stone
- Thirteen Heavens
