= Three Worlds =

Three Worlds can refer to:

- Popper's three worlds, an ontological framework by Karl Popper
- Three Worlds (Escher), a print by M. C. Escher
- Three Worlds (book), an 1877 religious book
- Three Worlds (film), a 2012 French film
- Three Worlds Theory, the Maoist concept
- Three-world model, the western political concept

== See also ==
- Trilok (disambiguation)
- Third World (disambiguation)
- Trailokya, the use of this term in Hinduism and Buddhism
