= Yohaulticetl =

Moon goddess and guardian of infants

In Aztec mythology, Yohualticetl, the "Lady of the Night", was a moon goddess and guardian of infants.

== See also ==
- Five Suns (mythology)
