= Tēcciztēcatl =

Lunar deity in Aztec mythology

Tecciztecatl
- Moon deity
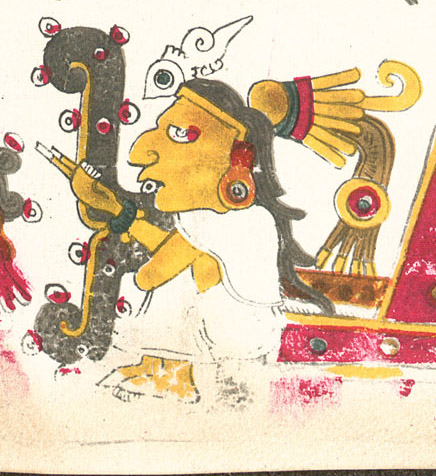
- Precolumbian image of Tecciztecatl
- Planet: Moon
- Gender: Male
- Ethnic group: Aztec

In Aztec mythology, Tecciztecatl (Classical Nahuatl: Tēcciztēcatl [teːk.sis.ˈteː.kat͡ɬ], "person from Tēcciztlān," a place name meaning "Place of the Conch," from tēcciztli or "conch"; also Tecuciztecatl, Teucciztecatl, from the variant form tēucciztli) was a lunar deity, representing the Man in the Moon.

The Aztecs believed that they were living in a universe dominated by generations of sun gods, the current one, known as Tonatiuh, was the fifth. The first three suns perished by wind storms, jaguars and fiery rain respectively. The fourth was wiped out by a flood causing some of the survivors to turn into fish and spread through the ocean.

After the fourth sun perished, the Aztecs believed that the gods assembled to decide which god was to become the next sun. They built a bonfire to sacrifice the next volunteer. Two gods – Nanahuatzin and Tecciztecatl – vied for the honor. Nanahuatzin, a poor god, was chosen because he could be spared. Proud Tecciztecatl insisted on the honor, but at the last moment hesitated. Nanahuatzin showed more courage and jumped into the fire. Tecciztecatl gained his courage and followed Nanahuatzin, thus forming two suns in the sky. The gods were angry that rich and proud Tecciztecatl had hesitated at his responsibilities as a noble, threw a rabbit at Tecciztecatl leaving an imprint of the rabbit's shape and dimming Tecciztecatl's brightness to the point where he could only be seen at night.

In some depictions, Tecciztecatl carried a large, white seashell on his back, tēucciztli in Nahuatl, representing the Moon itself; in others he had butterfly wings. He was a son of Tlaloc and Chalchiuhtlicue.

== See also ==
- List of lunar deities

== See also ==
- Coyolxauhqui
- Metztli or Mextli
- Yohaulticetl
