= Dogs in Mesoamerican folklore and myth =

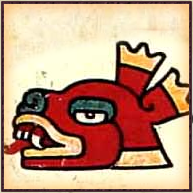
The Aztec day sign Itzcuintli (dog) from the Codex Laud.

Dogs have occupied a powerful place in Mesoamerican folklore and myth since at least the Classic Period right through to modern times. A common belief across the Mesoamerican region is that a dog carries the newly deceased across a body of water in the afterlife. Dogs appear in underworld scenes painted on Maya pottery dating to the Classic Period and even earlier than this, in the Preclassic, the people of Chupícuaro buried dogs with the dead. In the great Classic Period metropolis of Teotihuacan, 14 human bodies were deposited in a cave, most of them children, together with the bodies of three dogs to guide them on their path to the underworld.

The Xoloitzcuintli is a hairless dog from Mesoamerica. Zooarchaeological and genetic evidence suggests that the hairless breed likely originated in central Mexico before spreading to other parts of Mesoamerica. Archaeological evidence has been found in the tombs of the Colima, Mayan, Toltec, Zapotec, and Aztec people dating the breed to over 3500 years ago. Long regarded as guardians and protectors, the indigenous peoples believed that the Xolo would safeguard the home from evil spirits as well as intruders. In ancient times the Xolos were often sacrificed and then buried with their owners to act as guide to the soul on its journey to the underworld. These dogs were considered a great delicacy, and were consumed for sacrificial ceremonies – including marriages and funerals.

In many versions of the 20-day cycle of the Mesoamerican calendar, the tenth day bears the name dog. This is itzcuintli in Nahuatl, the language of the Aztecs, tz'i' in the Kʼicheʼ Maya language and oc in Yucatec Maya. Among the Mixtecs, the tenth day was taken by the coyote, ua.

== The Maya ==
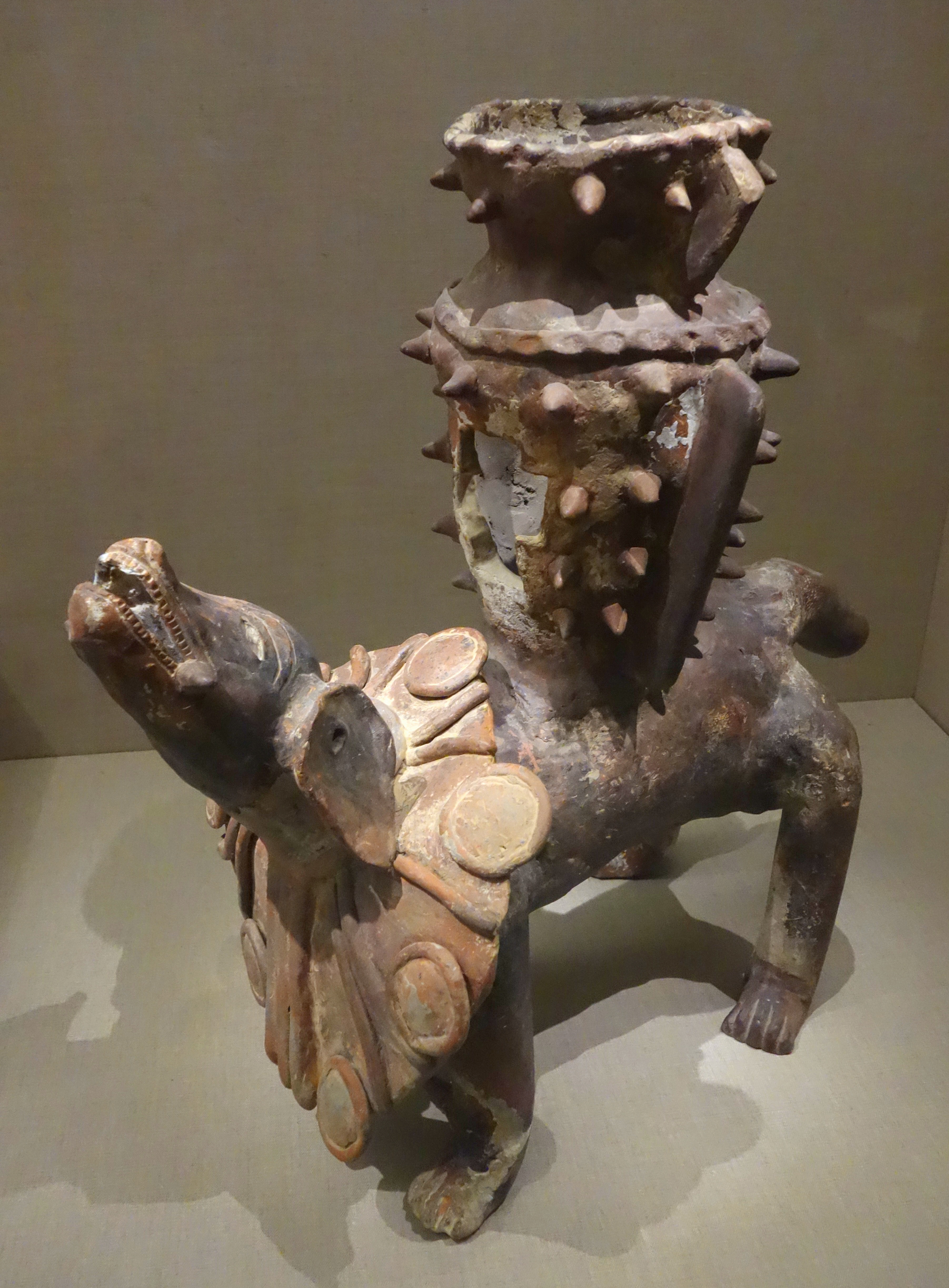
Postclassic Maya vessel or incense burner in the form of a dog. De Young Museum.

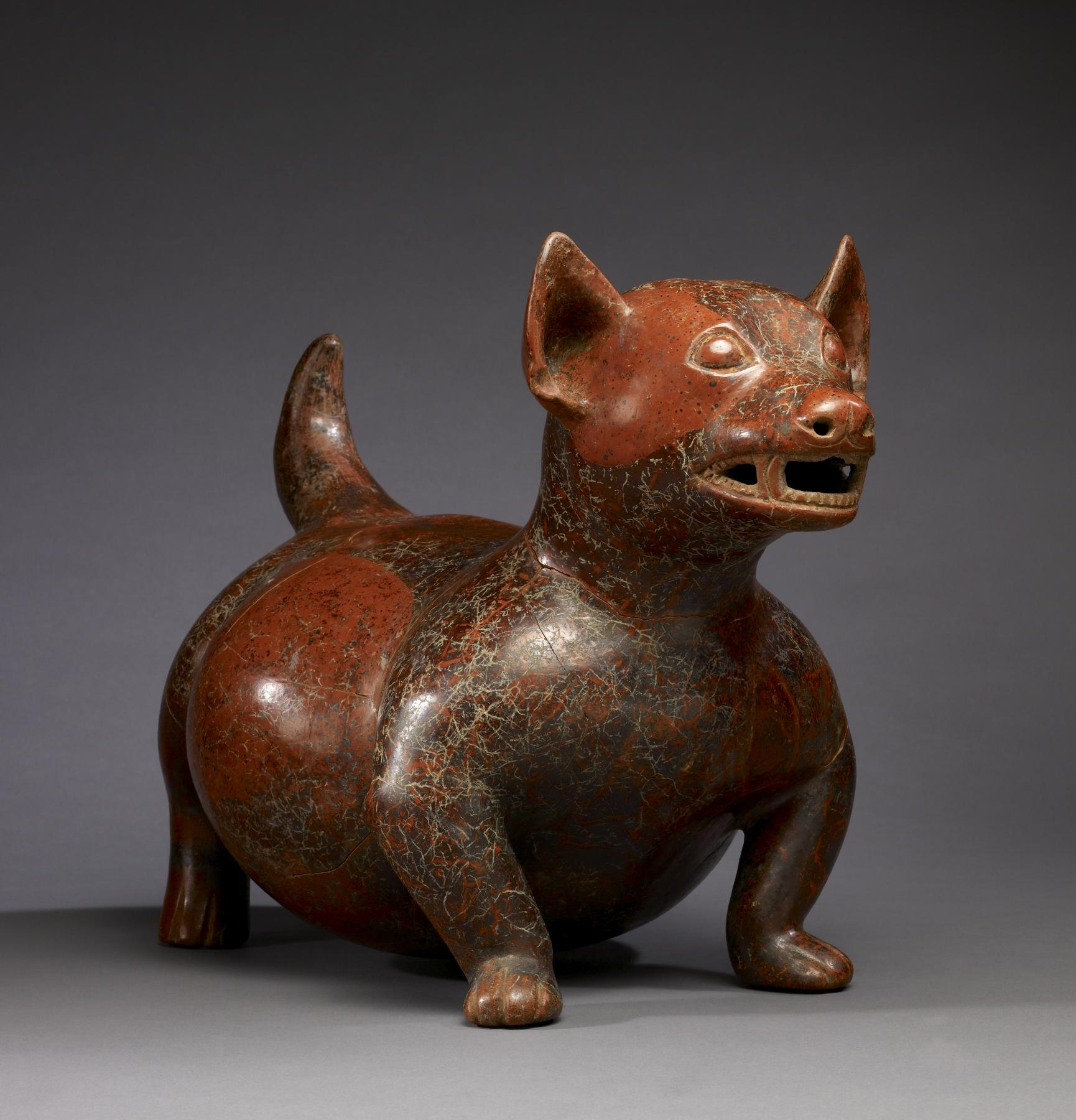
Dogs were associated with the deity Xolotl, the god of death. The roundness of the body might suggest its value as food for the posthumous soul. The Walters Art Museum.

Maya burials from the Classic Period are frequently found with associated animal remains, often dogs. For example, in the ruins of the Classic Maya city of Kaminaljuyu in Guatemala, a dog was found interred with a sitting skeleton, along with grave goods offered to the deceased. The frequent finds of dog skeletons in Classic Maya burials confirms that the belief that dogs guided the souls of the departed on their journey into the underworld already existed at this time.

The dog is sometimes depicted carrying a torch in the surviving Maya codices, which may be a reference to the Maya tradition that the dog brought fire to mankind.

In the Postclassic Popul Vuh of the Kʼicheʼ Maya of highland Guatemala, dogs and turkeys killed the people of the second age in retaliation for the people beating them. The people who escaped this fate were transformed into monkeys. Another account in the Popol Vuh describes the Hero twins sacrificing a dog that belonged to the Lords of the Underworld, also known as Xibalba. After the dog was dead, the Hero Twins brought it back to life. The Lords were so impressed that they asked the twins to sacrifice and resurrect them. In the end, the Hero Twins sacrificed the Lords of Xibalba and did not follow through on bringing them back to life. This made it possible for humans to live on earth. The story linked dogs with renewal and human life. Dogs are associated with death and have the job of leading people into the Underworld. They represent fire and are protectors of the hearth, two components of Maya life.

== The Aztecs and their contemporaries ==
In Aztec mythology, the Fourth Sun disappeared in a great flood. A man and a woman survived inside a log and were washed up upon a beach, where they promptly built a fire and roasted some fish. The smoke from the fire upset the stars Citlallatonac and Citlalicue, angering the great god Tezcatlipoca. In his fury, he severed their heads and stitched them onto their rears, creating the first dogs.

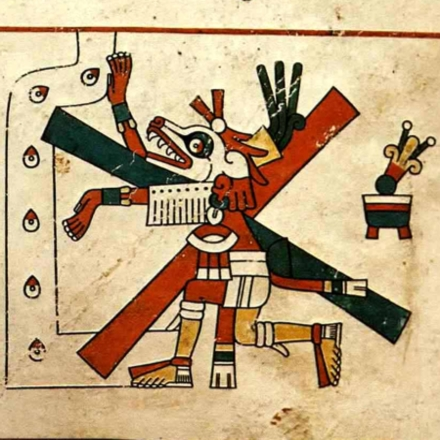
Xolotl from the 15th century Codex Fejervary-Mayer

Among the Aztecs, the god Xolotl was a monstrous dog. During the creation of the Fifth Sun, Xolotl was hunted by Death and escaped him by transforming himself first into a sprout of maize, then into maguey leaves and finally as a salamander in a pool of water. The third time that Death found Xolotl, he trapped and killed him. Three important foodstuffs were produced from the body of this mythological dog. Mictlantecuhtli, Lord of the Dead, had the bones of man in the underworld, kept over from the previous creations. Xolotl descended to the underworld to steal these bones so that man could be reborn in the new creation of the Fifth Sun. Xolotl managed to recover the bones and brought man to life by piercing his penis and bleeding upon them. Xolotl was seen as an incarnation of the planet Venus as the Evening Star (the Morning Star was his twin brother Quetzalcoatl). Xolotl was the canine companion of the Sun, following its path through both the sky and the underworld. Xolotl's strong connection with the underworld, death and the dead is demonstrated by the symbols he bore. In the Codex Borbonicus Xolotl is pictured with a knife in his mouth, a symbol of death, and has black wavy hair like the hair worn by the gods of death.

The fourteenth 13-day period of the tonalpohualli ritual calendar started with the day ce itzcuintli (1-dog) and people, especially rulers, were fated to be especially lucky if born on this day. The tenth day of the xiuhpohualli 20-day agricultural calendar, itzcuintli (dog), was governed by Mictlantecuhtli, the grim lord of the dead. In the Postclassic, when an Aztec commoner died he had to pass through each of the nine levels of Mictlan, the underworld. Mictlan was only reached after four years of wandering, accompanied by a dog that had been cremated with the deceased. The first level of Mictlan was called Apanoayan (where one crosses the river), this place was also known as Itzcuintlan (the Place of Dogs) because of the many dogs that roamed the near shore. A dog that recognised its former owner would carry him across the river on its back. In some accounts, the dogs on the shore act differently according to their colour, yellow dogs would carry the soul of the deceased across the river, while white dogs refuse because they have just washed themselves and black dogs refuse because either they have just swum the river or because they are dirty.

In Aztec folklore, the ahuizotl was a dog-like water monster with a hand on the end of its coiled tail. It was said to dwell underwater near river banks and would drag the unwary to a watery death. The victim's soul would be carried off to Tlalocan, one of the three Aztec paradises. A similar belief existed among the neighbouring Purépechas, their dog-god was called Uitzimengari and he saved the souls of drowned people by carrying them across to the Land of the Dead.

== Modern folklore ==
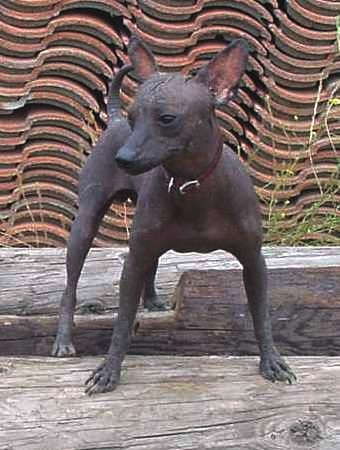
Xoloitzcuintli.

In modern times, the Chinantecs and Mixes of Oaxaca believe that a black dog will help the newly dead to cross a body of water, either a river or a sea, to the land of the dead. The Huitzilan believe that a dog carries the dead across the water to reach the underworld home of the Devil.

Across much of Mexico, evil sorcerers are believed to be able to transform themselves into a black dog in order to prey upon the livestock of their neighbours. In the states of central Mexico (such as Oaxaca, Tlaxcala and Veracruz) such a sorcerer is known as a nahual, in the Yucatan Peninsula they go by the name of huay chivo. Another supernatural dog in the folklore of Yucatan is the huay pek (witch-dog in Yucatec Maya), an enormous phantom black dog that attacks anybody that it meets and is said to be an incarnation of the Kakasbal, an evil spirit.

A folktale from Tlaxcala tells how some hunters saw an enormous black dog one night and decided to capture and keep it. It fled at their approach, so one hunter shot at it, wounding it in one leg. Following the blood trail they came to a richly furnished peasant hut, whose owner was tending a wound in his leg. They gave up the chase and headed for the nearest village, where the locals told them that the peasant had been a nahual who could transform into a dog to steal riches.

The Tzeltal and Tzotzil Maya of highland Chiapas in Mexico say that a white dog mated with Eve in the Third Creation, producing Ladinos, while a yellow dog fathered the indigenous peoples.

A Jakaltek tale from the Guatemalan Highlands relates how the first dog witnessed the creation of the world and ran everywhere telling everyone the secrets of creation. Hunab' Kuh, the Creator-God, was furious and swapped the dog's head for its tail and its tail for its head. Now, whenever a dog wants to talk and give away its secrets, it cannot speak, instead it may only wag its tail.

== See also ==
- Cadejo
- Dogs in Mesoamerica
- Dogs in religion
- Psychopomp
- Nagual
