= Fifth World (mythology) =

Creation myths describing the world

The Fifth World in the context of creation myths describes the present world as interpreted by several indigenous groups in the USA and Mexico. The central theme of the myth holds that there were four other cycles of creation and destruction that preceded the Fifth World. The creation story is taken largely from the mythological, cosmological, and eschatological beliefs and traditions of earlier Mesoamerican cultures.

== Aztec mythology ==
According to Aztec mythology, the present world is a product of four cycles of birth, death, and reincarnation. When each world is destroyed, it is reborn through the sacrifice of a god. The god’s sacrifice creates a new sun, which creates a new world. The myth is sometimes referred to as the “Legend of Five Suns.”

Jaguars, a hurricane, fire rain, and a flood destroyed the first four suns. After the fourth sun was destroyed, the gods gathered to choose a god to become the new sun. Tēcciztēcatl, a boastful and proud god, offered himself up for sacrifice. However, the rest of the gods favored Nanāhuātzin, the smallest and humblest god. The gods built a grand fire, but at the last second, Tēcciztēcatl refused to jump into the fire because he was too afraid of the pain. Instead, Nanahuatzin jumped in the fire. Embarrassed by Nanahuatzin’s sacrifice, Tēcciztēcatl followed him into the fire. The two suns rose in the sky, but they were too bright. The gods threw a rabbit at Tēcciztēcatl to dim his light, and he turned into the moon. This is why the Nahuas believe there is a rabbit that lives on the moon.

However, the sun remained motionless in the sky, burning the ground below. The gods then recognized they all must be sacrificed so that the people could survive. The god Ehecatl helped offering them up. The sacrifices made the sun move through the sky, energizing the earth instead of burning it.

=== Human sacrifice ===
In the Aztec tradition, the Fifth World is the last one, and after this one, the earth will not be recreated. This is why the Aztecs practised human sacrifice. The gods would only keep the sun alive as long as the Aztecs continued providing them with blood. Their worldview held a deep sense of indebtedness. Blood sacrifice was an often-used form of nextlāhualli "debt-payment". The Franciscan friar Bernardino de Sahagún wrote in his ethnography of Mesoamerica that the victim was someone who "gave his service.”

== Navajo mythology ==
The early concept of the world is similar: where the earth is an area of land floating in an ocean covered by a domed heaven. The domed heaven fits the land and ocean like a lid with its edges on the horizon. The Navajo creation story traces the evolution of life through four previous worlds until the people reach the fifth and present world. As the people passed through each of the previous four worlds, they went through evolution. They started out as insects and various animals until they became human in the Fourth World.

Upon arriving in the Fourth World the First Man was not satisfied. The land was barren. He planted a reed and it grew to the roof of the Fourth World. First Man sent the badger up the reed, but water began to drip before he could reach top so he returned. Next a locust climbed the reed. The locust made a headband with two crossed arrows on his forehead. With the help of all the gods the locust reached the Fifth World. When he pushed through mud he reached water and saw a black water bird swimming towards him. The bird told the locust that he could only stay if he could make magic. The locust took the arrows from his headband and pulled them through his body, between his shell and his heart. The black bird was convinced that the locust possessed great medicine, and he swam away taking the water with him. The locust returned to the lower world.

Now two days had passed and there was no sun. First Man sent the badger up to the Fifth World again. The badger returned covered with mud from a flood. First Man collected turquoise chips to offer to the five Chiefs of the Winds. They were satisfied with the gift, and they dried the Fifth World. When the badger returned he said that he had come out on dry earth. So First Man led the rest of people to the upper world. So with the explicit help of the gods the people reached the Fifth World similar to the Aztec creation story.

Now after all the people had arrived from the lower worlds First Man and First Woman placed the mountain lion on one side and the wolf on the other. They divided the people into two groups. The first group chose the wolf for their chief. The mountain lion was the chief for the other side. The people who had the mountain lion chief turned were to be the people of the Earth. The people with the wolf chief became the animals.

Navajo medicine men say there are two worlds above the Fifth World. The first is the World of the Spirits of Living Things and the second is the Place of Melting into One.

The Navajo legends are an oral account that is passed down from generation to generation. There are various versions of the story—as there are in any oral account—but the variations are slight.

== Hopi mythology ==
The Hopi’s creation myth is slightly different than the creation myths of the Aztecs and Navajo. The Hopi believe we are currently living in the Fourth World, but are on the threshold of the Fifth World.

In each of the three previous worlds, humanity was destroyed by destructive practices and wars. In the most common version of the story the Spider Grandmother (Kookyangso'wuuti) caused a reed to grow into the sky, and it emerged in the Fourth World at the sipapu, a small tunnel or inter-dimensional passage. As the end of one world draws near the sipapu appears to lead the Hopi into the next phase of the world.
