= The fourth part of the world =

The fourth part of the world may refer to:

- The New World, also called "the fourth part of the world"
- Americae Sive Quartae Orbis Partis Nova Et Exactissima Descriptio or The Fourth Part of the World, a 1562 geographical map
- The Fourth Part of the World: The Epic Story of History's Greatest Map, a 2009 book by Toby Lester

== See also ==
- Johannes Schöner globe, for popularization of the term.
- Four continents
- Four corners of the world (disambiguation)
- Fourth World (disambiguation)
