= Third World (disambiguation) =

The Third World is a term used originally to describe the nations not aligned with either the First World or the Second World regardless of development, though the more common, contemporary use denotes the developing countries of Asia-Pacific, Latin America and the Caribbean, the Middle East and North Africa, and Sub-Saharan Africa.

Third World may also refer to:

== Arts ==
- Third World (band), the Jamaican reggae band formed in 1973
  - Third World (album), 1976
- The Third World (album), a 1970 album by Gato Barbieri
- The 3rd World, a 2008 album by Immortal Technique
- Third World (video game), a cancelled video game from Activision

== Political entities ==
- Developing countries
- Third World, a part of the Maoist Three Worlds Theory, a Cold War political concept

== See also ==
- Three Worlds (disambiguation)
- Third World Child, a 1987 album by Johnny Clegg
- Third-world feminism or Postcolonial feminism
- Third World Media, an adult film production company
