= Nanāhuātzin =

Aztec deity

- Sun
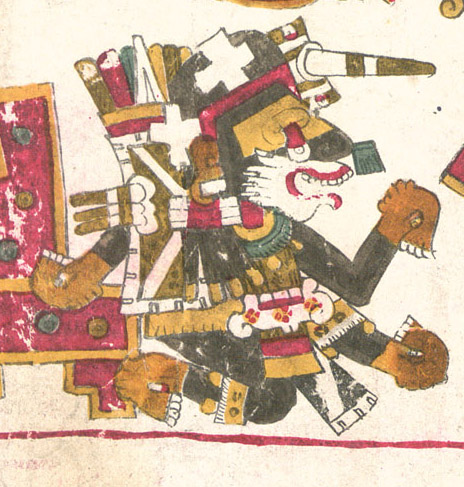
- Nanāhuātzin
- Gender: Male
- Parents: Ītzpāpālōtl and Cozcamiyauh or Tonantzin (birth parents) Piltzintecuhtli and Xōchiquetzal (adoptive parents)

In Aztec mythology, the god Nanāhuātzin or Nanāhuātl (or Nanauatzin, the suffix -tzin implies respect or familiarity; Classical Nahuatl: Nanāhuātzin [nanaːˈwaːtsin]), the most humble of the gods, sacrificed himself in fire so that he would continue to shine on Earth as the Sun, thus becoming the solar deity. Nanāhuātzin means "full of sores." According to a translation of the Histoyre du Mechique, Nanāhuātzin is the son of Ītzpāpālōtl and Cozcamiauh or Tonantzin, but was adopted by Piltzintecuhtli and Xōchiquetzal. In the Codex Borgia, Nanāhuātzin is represented as a man emerging from a fire. This was originally interpreted as an illustration of cannibalism. He is probably an aspect of Xolotl.

== Aztec tradition ==
The Aztecs had various myths about the creation, and Nanāhuātzin participates in several. In the legend of Quetzalcōātl, Nanāhuātzin helps Quetzalcōātl to obtain the first grains, which will be the food of humankind. In Aztec mythology, the universe is not considered permanent or everlasting, but rather subject to death, like any living creature. However, even as it dies, the universe is reborn into a new age, or "Sun." Nanāhuātzin is best known from the legend of the Five Suns as related by Bernardino de Sahagún.

In this legend, which forms the basis for most Nahua myths, there were four creations. In each one, one god has taken on the task of serving as the sun: Tezcatlipoca, Quetzalcōātl, Tlaloc, and Chalchiuhtlicue. Each age ended because the gods were not satisfied with the humans they had created. Finally, Quetzalcōātl, with the aid of Xolotl, retrieves the sacred bones of their ancestors, mixes them with corn and his own blood, and manages to make acceptable human beings. However, no other god wants the task of being the Sun.

The gods decide that the fifth, and possibly last, sun must offer up his life as a sacrifice in fire. Two gods are chosen: Tēcciztēcatl and Nanāhuātzin. The former is chosen to serve as the Sun because he is wealthy and strong, while the latter will serve as the Moon because he is poor and ill. Tēcciztēcatl, who is proud, sees his impending sacrifice and transformation as an opportunity to gain immortality. The humble Nanāhuātzin accepts because he sees it as his duty. During the days leading up to the sacrifice, both gods undergo purification. Tēcciztēcatl makes offerings of rich gifts and coral. Nanāhuātzin offers his blood and performs acts of penance.

The gods prepare a large bonfire that burns for four days, and construct a platform high above it from which the two chosen gods must leap into the flames. On the appointed day, Tēcciztēcatl and Nanāhuātzin seat themselves upon the platform, awaiting the moment of sacrifice. The gods call upon Tēcciztēcatl to immolate himself first. After four attempts to throw himself onto the pyre, which is giving off extremely strong heat by this time, his courage fails him and he desists. Disgusted at Tēcciztēcatl's cowardice, the gods call upon Nanāhuātzin, who rises from his seat and steps calmly to the edge of the platform. Closing his eyes, he leaps from the edge, landing in the very center of the fire. His pride wounded upon seeing that Nanāhuātzin had the courage that he lacked, Tēcciztēcatl jumped upon the burning pyre after him.

Nothing happens at first, but eventually two suns appear in the sky. One of the gods, angry over Tēcciztēcatl's lack of courage, takes a rabbit and throws it in Tēcciztēcatl's face, causing him to lose his brilliance. Tēcciztēcatl thus becomes the moon, which bears the impression of a rabbit to this very day. Yet the Sun remains unmoving in the sky, parching and burning all the ground beneath. Finally, the gods realize that they, too, must allow themselves to be sacrificed so that human beings may live. They present themselves to Ehecatl, who offers them up one by one. Then, with the powerful wind that arises as a result of their sacrifice, Ehecatl makes the Sun move through the sky, nourishing the earth rather than scorching it.

== Nanāhuātzin and Xolotl ==
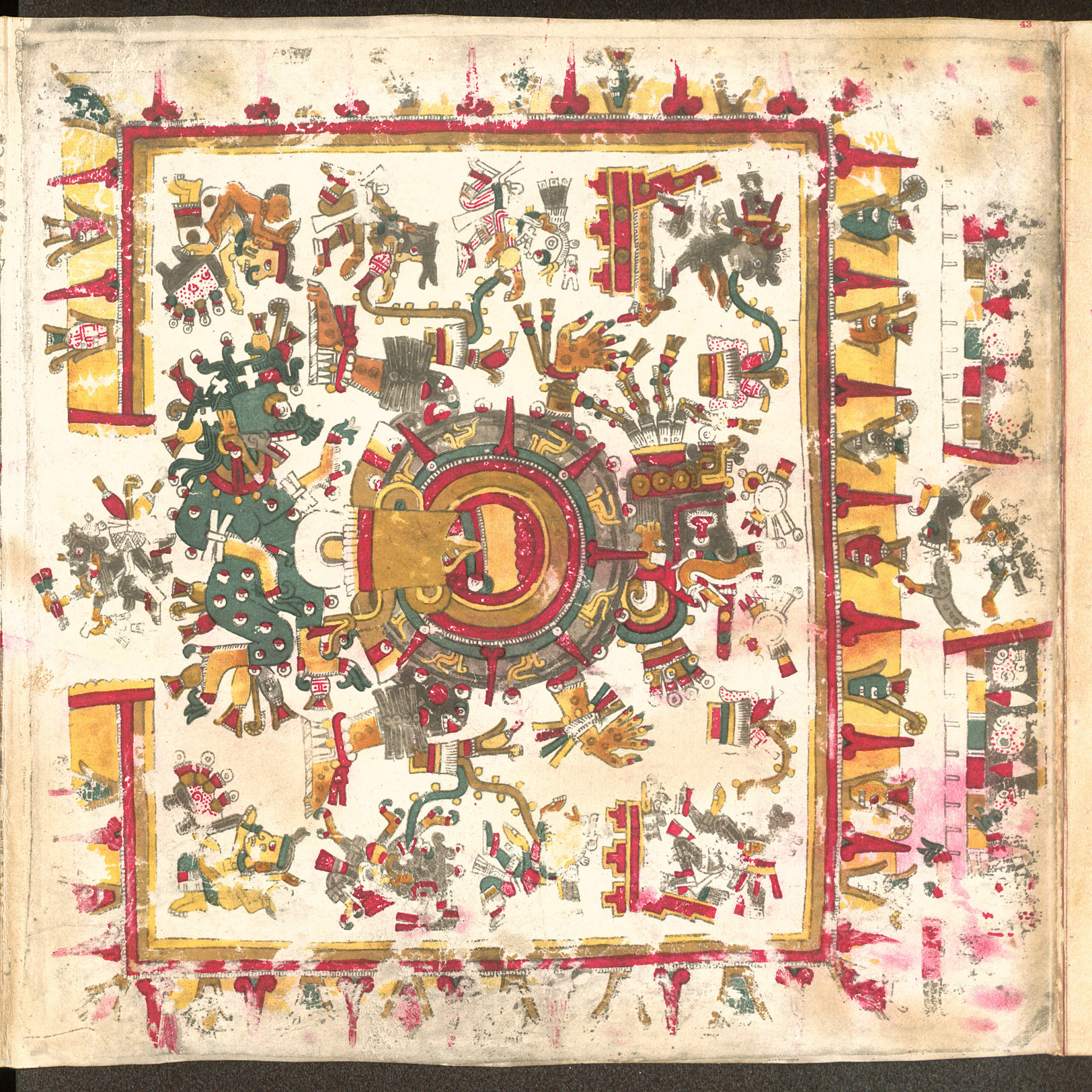
Codex Borgia page 43 depicts a Sun god with the bumpy skin of Nanāhuātzin and the canine snout of Xolotl. Beneath this sun-bearing Xolotl/Nanāhuātzin lies the source of maize, a nude female divinity who has star symbols on her body.

A close relationship between Xolotl and Nanāhuātzin exists. Xolotl is probably identical with Nanāhuātl. Seler characterizes Nanāhuātzin ("Little Pustule-Covered One"), who is deformed by syphilis, as an aspect of Xolotl in his capacity as god of monsters, deforming diseases, and deformities. The syphilitic god Nanāhuātzin is an avatar of Xolotl.

== Salvadoran Nahuatl tradition ==
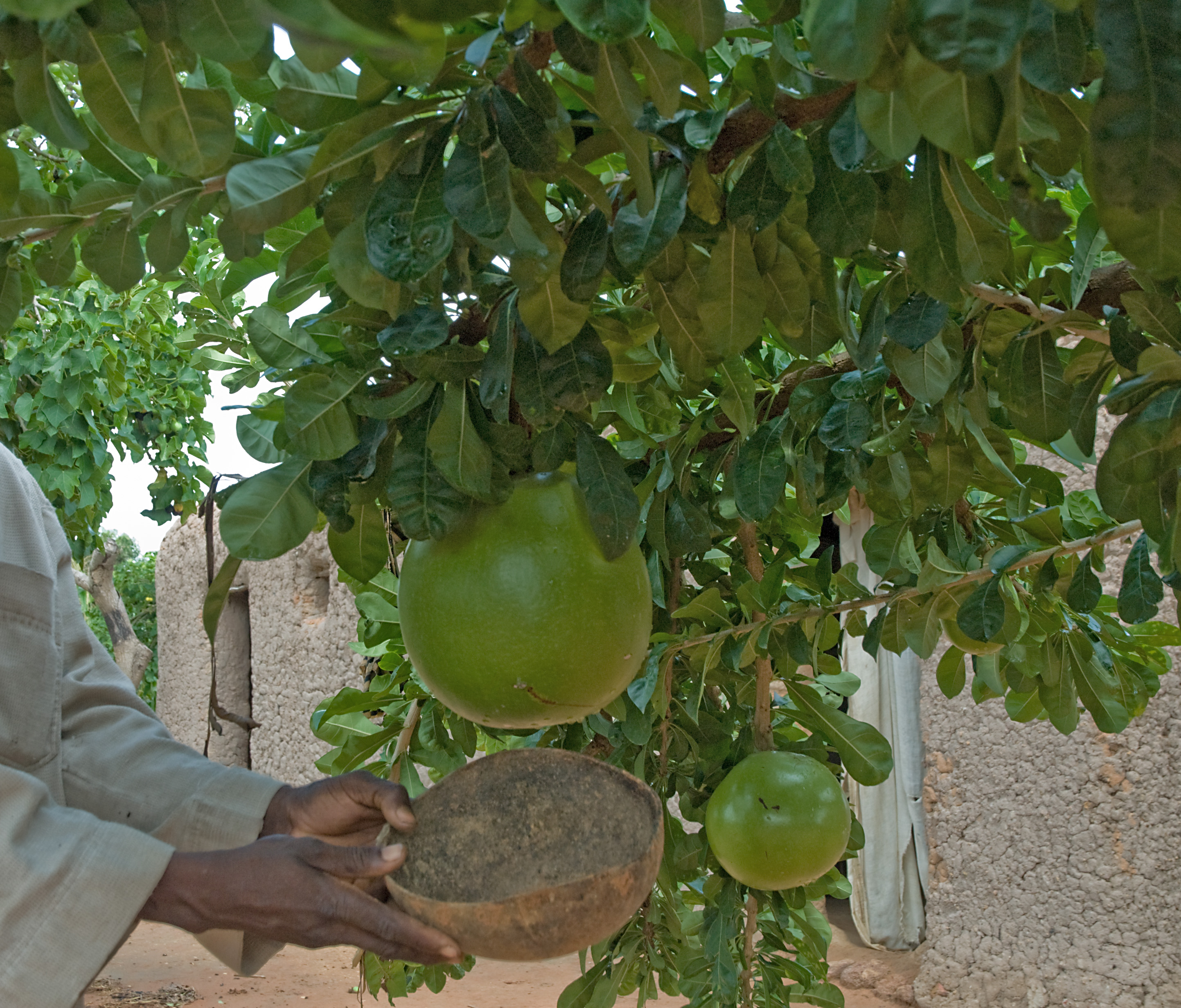
The Mesoamerican calabash tree

The fifth sun is identified with Tōnatiuh. Nanāhuātzin was the youngest of three boys and a girl named Xōchicihuātl, who had emerged from the fruit of the Mesoamerican calabash (Crescentia cujete), which in turn had grown from the head of a woman who had flown into the night while her body slept. (The head attached itself to a startled deer, and the deer leapt into a canyon, there planting the head in the ground.) Nanāhuātzin and his siblings were raised by Tlantepozilamatl "Old Woman of the Metal Teeth", a deity associated with the tzitzimīmeh, until she gave some food to her lover that they had obtained. The siblings proceeded to butcher that lover and, calling it venison, fed his body to the old woman, then killed her. The siblings discovered that the world's supply of maize was concealed within a mountain, known only to a bird that fed on that stock. Where his siblings had failed, Nanāhuātzin succeeded in opening the mountain, but in doing so, was himself trapped within.

== See also ==
- List of solar deities
