= The Fourth World (novel) =

2000 science fiction novel by Dennis Danvers

- Author: Dennis Danvers
- Genre: Science fiction
- Publisher: Eos Books
- Publication date: March 2000
- ISBN: 978-0-380-97761-1

The Fourth World is a science fiction novel by American writer Dennis Danvers, originally published in March 2000 by Eos Books. It takes place in 2013, primarily in the Mexican state of Chiapas, and suggests that, in the future, society has been divided by corporate greed into the upper and lower classes, with the middle class having been all but eliminated.

== Plot summary ==
Santee St. John is a reporter for NewsReal, a shock site for which he records video via a virtual “interface” allowing viewers to actually experience his recordings on the World Wide Web. He is sent to record a massacre of indigenous people being attacked at Chiapas, Mexico without warning by landowners working for capitalist corporations. However, due to a business deal with Mexico’s government, NewsReal decides not to show the story, prompting Santee to take a sabbatical. While on sabbatical, he meets Margaret Mayfield, a rebel Zapatista with whom he is swayed to travel with and, eventually, fall in love with and decide to fight against the capitalist elite.

St. John and Mayfield join a group called Intrepid Explorers, working for the corporations, in order to find a strong group of Zapatistas to join. They are met by an individual claiming to be Subcomandante Marcos, the first revolutionary to use cyberspace, who helped Santee and Margaret establish a plan: to give the rebel victims of the capitalists’ massacres interfaces. This will allow the entire world to experience their sufferings via the World Wide Web by actually taking on all sense perceptions of that person through a completely realistic virtual reality simulator.

Margaret Mayfield went on her part of the mission with Webster Webfoot, who used to be one of the most highly rated internet stars but became a “webkicker” and now tries to avoid using an interface whenever possible. However, once there, she is told that Santee is dead and that the funeral will be held the very next day; she and Webster travel to Chiapas, where the funeral is to be held, and discover that Santee is not actually dead, but that someone has faked his demise. Margaret abandons Webster, leaving him some cash for travel, and travels with a hotel owner named Zack Hayman who seems to have an inside connection with the conspirators.

In Chiapas, Margaret discovers that Santee left her a personalized interface, which cannot be activated until Santee is actually present. At the same time, Webster’s girlfriend on the internet, Starchilde or “Starr” for short, discovers through her work on a space station that there exists oil on Mars. This means that biological extraterrestrial life must have existed on the planet at some point. As a result of that now Mexican rebels are being shipped to Mars in order to harvest the oil. Back on Earth, Zack, the hotel manager whom Margaret is with, discovers that the rebels are being sent to Mars in part so that the rich landowners can take their land without resistance. Santee and Margaret believed that they were setting up the victims with interfaces so that they would be able to show their sufferings to others outside of Mexico, but in fact the interfaces are going to make them think that they are receiving messages from Santee, while in actuality they are being tricked into going to Mars as slave labor.

On the ship near Mars, Starr discovers that the slaves are to be sent to Mars in order to live there for a time and scout out any biological hazards or chemical hazards. Starr meets an intelligent AI, called Alice Irene, who serves as a literal deus ex machine. Starr convinces Alice Irene to join the cause of the rebels by having her examine the entire Internet and come to her own conclusions about the corruption of the current capitalist regime. While Starr is given control of the ship, the Zapatistas have taken over control with the assistance of Alice Irene. The revolutionaries are given the option to stay on Earth or go to Mars, but as a form of utopian paradise rather than as slave labor. Santee St. John and Margaret Mayfield choose to stay on earth, while the remaining main characters choose life on Mars.

== Political significance ==
Featuring constant positive references to the Zapatistas, attacks on corporate greed, and explicitly posing the question of how one could be the enemy if one is poor, this novel clearly argues in favor for an economically leftist government that promotes human and civil rights above the welfare of economic entities. The novel additionally argues in favor for localized governments as opposed to globalization, and contends that indigenous people should be free from outside influence and allowed to make their own decisions.

Many of the names, places, and events in the book closely echo the actual political scenario involving the Zapatista Army of National Liberation, which is also based in Chiapas and also has Subcomandante Marcos as their leader. In Marcos’ writings, he called the Cold War the “Third World War”, and has claimed that neoliberalism and globalization constitute the “Fourth World War”, which presumably served as the title for Danvers’ book. Throughout the book, corporations are consistently portrayed as evil, as well as all land and property owners; the one land owner in the book who finds favor with Alice Irene, Zack Hayman, gave up the deed to his land to his wife in order that he might join the revolutionary movement.

The anarcho-socialist Zapatista revolutionaries in the book find it acceptable to use the tools of the capitalists against them, such as by riding in Coca-Cola trucks for transportation; however, they are content to steal drinks when they desire, thus harming the corporation. The capitalists’ ultimate tool, Alice Irene, the artificially intelligent being created for the supervision of the Martian population program, was also the deus ex machina that allowed Starrchilde to take control of the ship. Thus, the novel implies that it is acceptable to use the capitalists’ own tools against them for the sake of their own political end.

The novel features a reference to 2001: A Space Odyssey in that Starr’s full name is Starchilde, an allusion to the new creature at the end of the film that is presumably the next stage of humanity’s evolution; this represents the political uprising in the novel as being a rebirth of humanity and the next stage in human evolution, entirely new creatures existing outside of capitalist concerns. The novel also contains references to Webster’s mother being addicted to living via interface in the world of the Dragons of Pern, where life itself is heavily genetically modified to defend human colonists. This might be understood as a jab against colonialism, as it is willing to modify the nature of life, or as an attack against escapism, since the dragons serve as a mere diversion from the real world. The novel additionally alludes to The Postman with Kevin Costner, and notes the irony in that the viewers were living in the time of an apocalypse, even while the watching the movie, as the political implications of widespread capitalism had corrupted society to its core.
