= Xolotl =

Aztec god of fire and lightning

- God of twilight, fire, lightning, and twins, lord of monsters, misfortune, death, sickness, and deformities
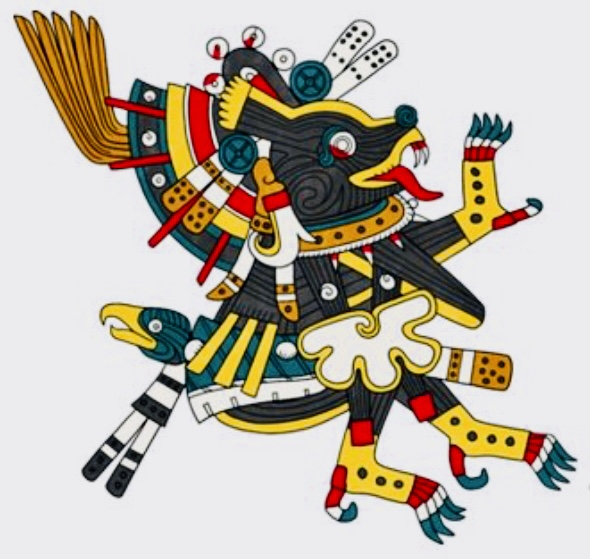
- Xolotl as depicted in the Codex Borgia
- Other names: Evil twin, Xoloitzcuintle, Xoloitzcuintli, Xolo
- Abode: Mictlān (the Underworld)
- Planet: Venus (Evening Star) Mercury (Codex Borgia)
- Symbol: Xoloitzcuintle
- Gender: Male
- Region: Mesoamerica
- Ethnic group: Nahuas

Genealogy
- Parents: Mixcoatl and Chimalma (Codex Chimalpopoca)
- Siblings: Quetzalcoatl (Codex Chimalpopoca)
- Consort: None
- Children: None

In Aztec mythology, Xolotl (Nahuatl pronunciation: [ˈʃolot͡ɬ]) was a god of fire and lightning. He was commonly depicted as a dog-headed man and was a psychopomp. He was also god of twins, monsters, death, misfortune, sickness, and deformities. Xolotl is the canine brother and twin of Quetzalcōātl, the pair being sons of the virgin Chīmalmā. He is the dark personification of Venus as the Evening Star, and was associated with heavenly fire. The axolotl is named after him.

== Myths and functions ==
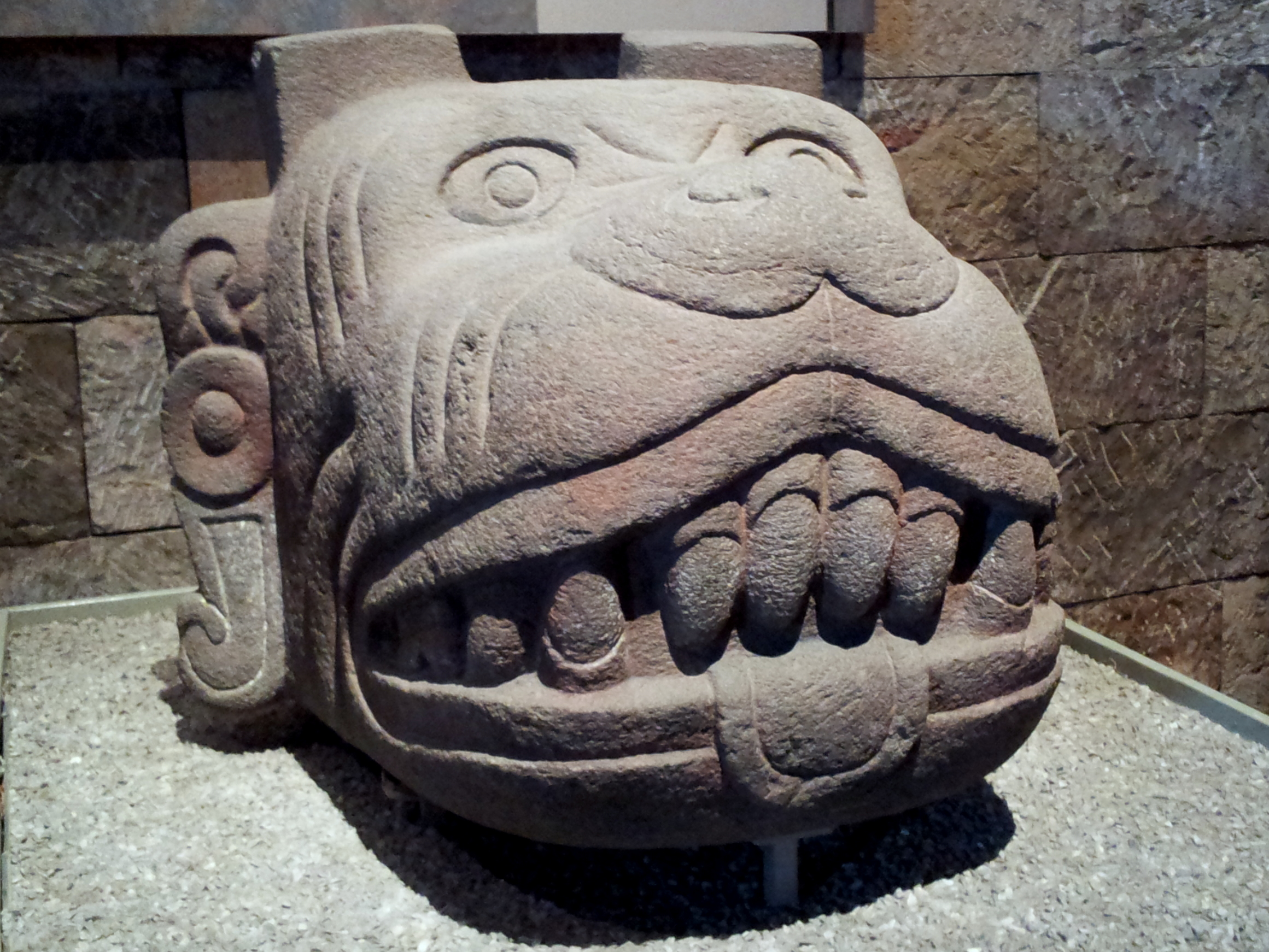
Xolotl statue displayed at the National Museum of Anthropology, Mexico City.

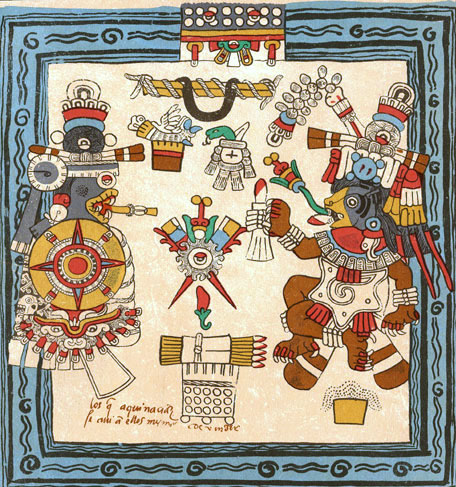
Codex Borbonicus (p. 16) Xolotl is depicted as a companion of the Setting Sun. He is pictured with a knife in his mouth, a symbol of death.

Xolotl was the sinister god of monstrosities who wears the conch-like ehēcailacacōcatl "twisted wind jewel" of Quetzalcōātl. His job was to protect the sun from the dangers of the underworld. As a double of Quetzalcōātl, Xolotl accompanied Quetzalcōātl to Mictlān, the land of the dead, or the underworld, to retrieve the bones from those who inhabited the previous world (Nāhuiātl) to create new life for the present world, Nahui Ollin, the sun of movement. In a sense, this recreation of life is reenacted every night when Xolotl guides the sun through the underworld. In the tōnalpōhualli, Xolotl rules over day Olin "movement" and over the trecena 1-Cozcacuauhtli (vulture).

His empty eye sockets are explained in the legend of Teotihuacan, in which the gods decided to sacrifice themselves for the newly created sun. Xolotl withdrew from this sacrifice and wept so much that his eyes fell out of their sockets. According to the creation recounted in the Florentine Codex, after the Fifth Sun was initially created, it did not move. Ehecatl ("God of Wind") consequently began slaying all other gods to induce the newly created Sun into movement. Xolotl, however, was unwilling to die in order to give movement to the new Sun. Xolotl transformed himself into a young maize plant with two stalks (xolotl), a doubled maguey plant (mexolotl), and an amphibious animal (axolotl). Xolotl is thus a master transformer. In the end, Ehecatl succeeded in finding and killing Xolotl.

In art, Xolotl was typically depicted as a dog-headed man, a skeleton, or a deformed monster with reversed feet. A censer in the form of a skeletal canine depicts Xolotl. As a psychopomp, Xolotl would guide the dead on their journey to Mictlān, the afterlife in myths. His two spirit animal forms are the xoloitzcuintle breed of dog and the aquatic salamander species known as the axolotl. Xolos served as companions to the Aztecs in this life and also in the afterlife, as many dog remains and dog sculptures have been found in Aztec burials, including some at the main temple in Tenochtitlan. Dogs were often subject to ritual sacrifice so that they could accompany their master on his voyage through Mictlan, the underworld. Their main duty was to help their owners cross a deep river. It is possible that dog sculptures also found in burials were also intended to help people on this journey. Xoloitzcuintli is the official name of the Mexican hairless dog (also known as perro pelón mexicano in Mexican Spanish), a pre-Columbian canine breed from Mesoamerica dating back to over 3,500 years ago. This is one of many native dog breeds in the Americas and it is often confused with the Peruvian Hairless Dog. The Nahuatl origin of this name, Xoloitzcuīntli, references Xolotl because this dog's mission was to accompany the souls of the dead in their journey into eternity. The name "axolotl" connects it to Xolotl. The most common translation is "water-dog": ātl for water and xolotl for dog.

In the Aztec calendar, the ruler of the day Itzcuīntli ("Dog"), is Mictlāntēcutli "lord of Mictlān", the god of death and the underworld.

== Origin ==
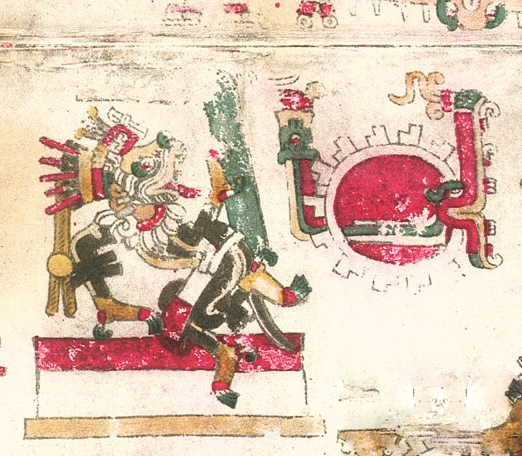
Codex Borgia (p. 38) Xolotl with Xiuhcōātl "Fire Serpent"

Xolotl is sometimes depicted carrying a torch in the surviving Maya codices, which reference the Maya tradition that the dog brought fire to mankind. In the Mayan codices, the dog is conspicuously associated with the god of death, storm, and lightning. Xolotl appears to have affinities with the Zapotec and Maya lightning-dog, and may represent the lightning which descends from the thundercloud, the flash, the reflection of which arouses the misconceived belief that lightning is "double", and leads them to suppose a connection between lightning and twins.

Xolotl originated in the southern regions, and may represent fire rushing down from the heavens or light flaming up in the heavens. Xolotl was originally the name for the lightning beast of the Maya, often taking the form of a dog. The dog plays an important role in Maya manuscripts. He is the lightning beast, who darts from heaven with a torch in his hand. Xolotl is represented directly as a dog, and is distinguished as the deity of air and of the four directions of the wind by Quetzalcoatl's breast ornament. Xolotl is to be considered equivalent to the beast darting from heaven of the Maya manuscript. The dog is the animal of the dead and therefore of the Place of Shadows.

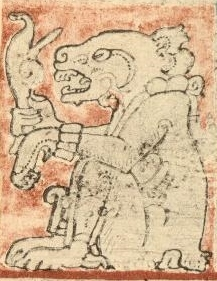
Dresden Codex Dog (p. 7)

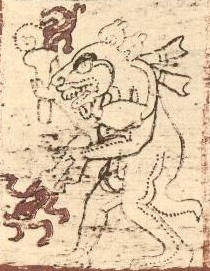
Dog (p. 39)

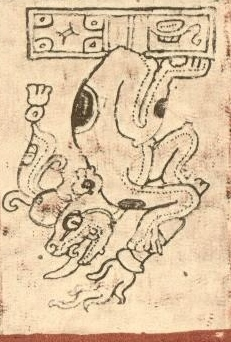
Dog (p. 40)

== Ollin and Xolotl ==
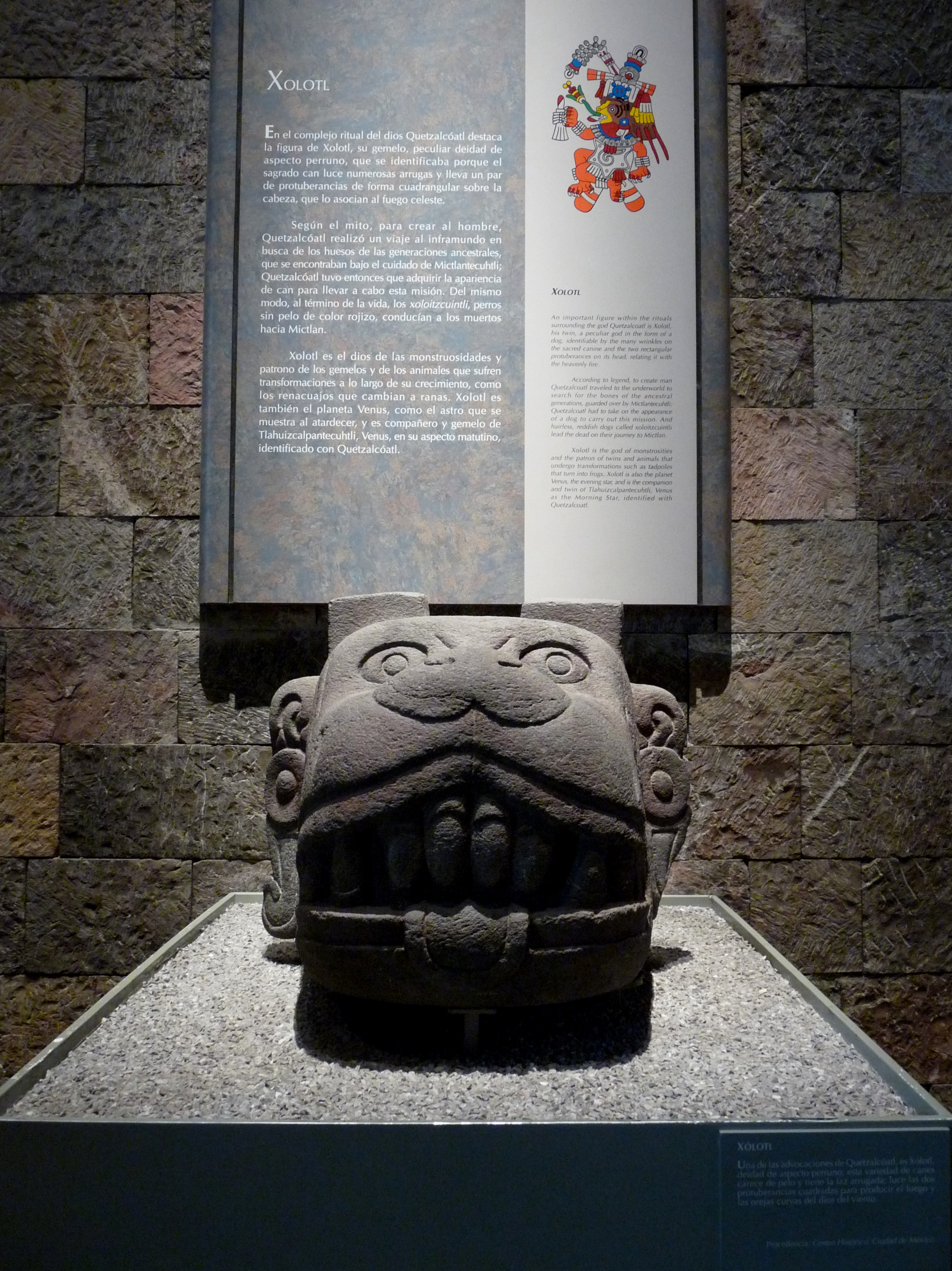
Stone sculpture representing the head of the Aztec god Xolotl. "An important figure within the rituals surrounding the god Quetzalcoatl is Xolotl, his twin, a peculiar god in the form of a dog, identifiable by the many wrinkles on the sacred canine and the two rectangular protuberances on its head, relating it with the heavenly fire."

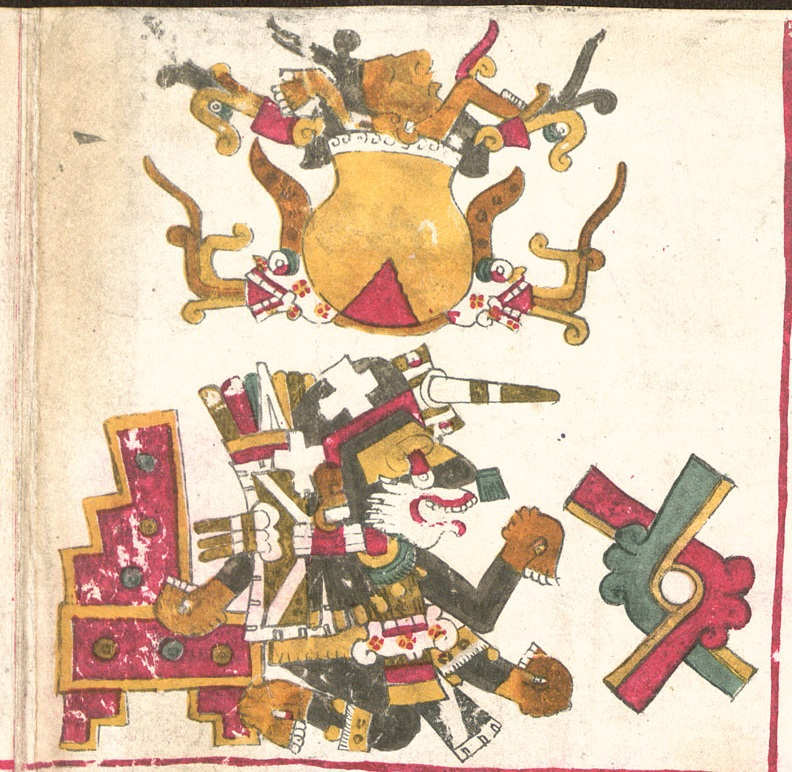
Day symbol Ollin in Codex Borgia (p.10)

Eduard Seler associates Xolotl's portrayal as a dog with the belief that dogs accompany the souls of the dead to Mictlan. He finds further evidence of the association between Xolotl, dogs, death, and Mictlan in the fact that Mesoamericans viewed twins as unnatural monstrosities and consequently commonly killed one of the two twins shortly after birth. Seler speculates that Xolotl represents the murdered twin who dwells in the darkness of Mictlan, while Quetzalcoatl ("The Precious Twin") represents the surviving twin who dwells in the light of the sun.

In manuscripts the setting sun, devoured by the earth, is opposite Xolotl's image. Quetzalcoatl and Xolotl constitute the twin phases of Venus as the morning and evening star, respectively. Quetzalcoatl as the morning star acts as the harbinger of the Sun's rising (rebirth) every dawn, Xolotl as the evening star acts as the harbinger of the Sun's setting (death) every dusk. In this way they divide the single life-death process of cyclical transformation into its two phases: one leading from birth to death, the other from death to birth.

Xolotl was the patron of the Mesoamerican ballgame. Some scholars argue the ballgame symbolizes the Sun's perilous and uncertain nighttime journey through the underworld. Xolotl is able to help in the Sun's rebirth since he possesses the power to enter and exit the underworld. In several of the manuscripts Xolotl is depicted striving at this game against other gods. For example, in the Codex Mendoza we see him playing with the moon-god, and can recognize him by the sign ollin which accompanies him, and by the gouged-out eye in which that symbol ends. Seler thinks "that the root of the name ollin suggested to Mexicans the motion of the rubber ball olli and, as a consequence, ball-playing."

Ollin is pulsating, oscillating, and centering motion-change. It is typified by bouncing balls, pulsating hearts, labor contractions, earthquakes, flapping butterfly wings, the undulating motion of weft activities in weaving, and the oscillating path of the Fifth Sun over and under the surface of the earth. Ollin is the motion-change of cyclical completion.

A jade statue of a skeletal Xolotl carrying a solar disc bearing an image of the Sun on his back (called "the Night Traveler") succinctly portrays Xolotl's role in assisting the Sun through the process of death, gestation, and rebirth. Xolotl's association with ollin motion-change suggests proper completions and gestations must instantiate ollin motion-change. Ollin-shaped decomposition and integration (i.e., death) promote ollin-shaped composition and integration (i.e., rebirth and renewal).

== Nanahuatzin and Xolotl ==
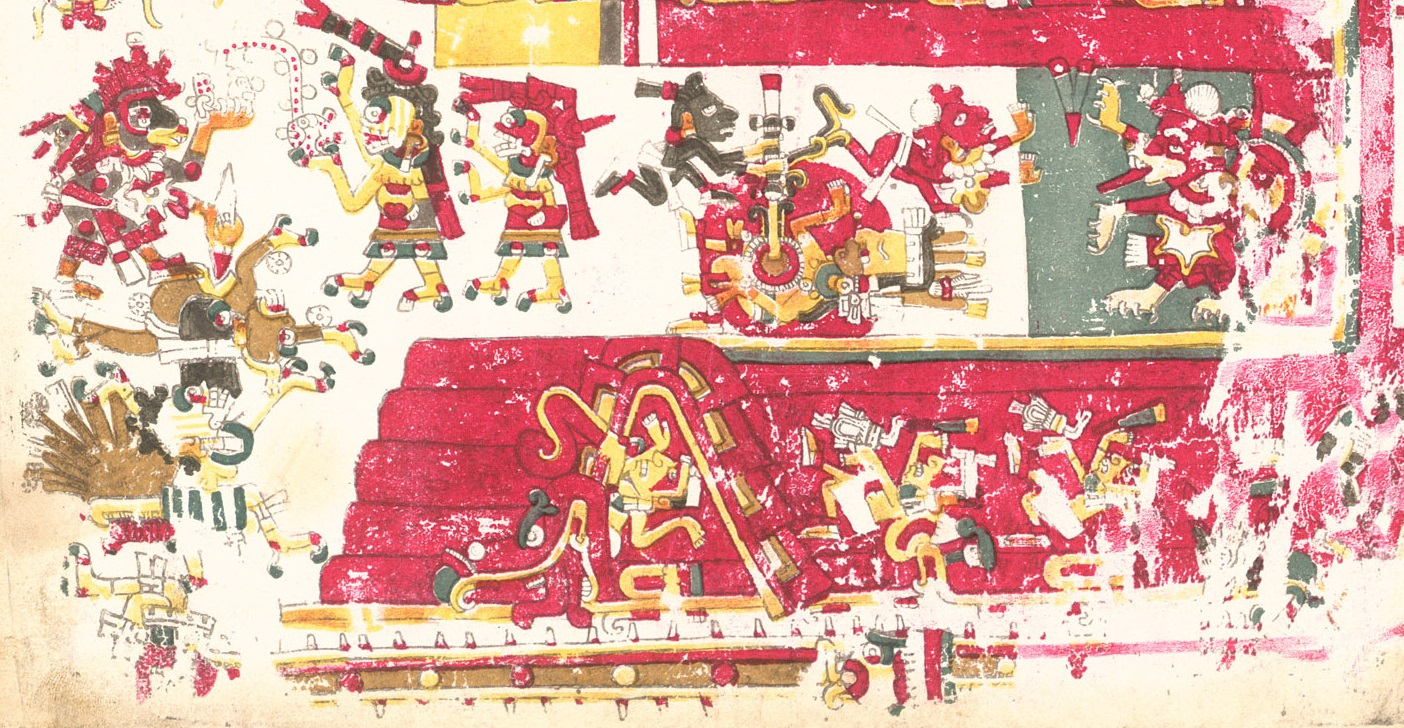
Codex Borgia (p. 34) Xolotl sacrifices the rain god. Within the sanctuary of the Red Temple, the Sun is finally born. Against the background of a solid red disk, a warrior drills a fire on the chest of a figure lying down. From the smoke emerges a red solar deity with the wind jewel. Immediately to the right, the deity is enthroned in the temple. He now has canine claws, a canine mouth mask, the wind jewel, and a distended eye that identify him as the red Xolotl, he also carries the Sun on his back.

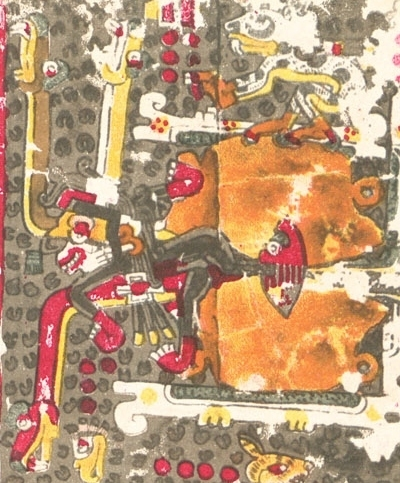
Codex Borgia (p. 47) a dog Xolotl accompanies an anthropomorphic avatar of Xolotl.

A close relationship between Xolotl and Nanahuatzin exists. Xolotl is probably identical with Nanahuatl (Nanahuatzin). Seler characterizes Nanahuatzin ("Little Pustule Covered One"), who is deformed by syphilis, as an aspect of Xolotl in his capacity as god of monsters, deforming diseases, and deformities. The syphilitic god Nanahuatzin is an avatar of Xolotl.

== See also ==
- Anubis
- Dogs in Mesoamerican folklore and myth
- List of death deities
- Nagual
- Black dog (folklore)
- Codex Xolotl
- King Xolotl, grandfather of king Tezozomoc
