= List of Mexican inventions and discoveries =

Mexican inventions and discoveries are objects, processes or techniques invented or discovered, partially or entirely, by a person from Mexico. These also include concepts or practices introduced by Mexican people and their indigenous ancestors. Some of the objects, processes or techniques developed in the Pre-Columbian era were also invented or discovered independently in other cultures. This list shows only inventions and discoveries first introduced in present-day Mexican territory, or those that vary significantly in concept, figure, or use.

== Pre-Hispanic ==
=== Musical instruments ===
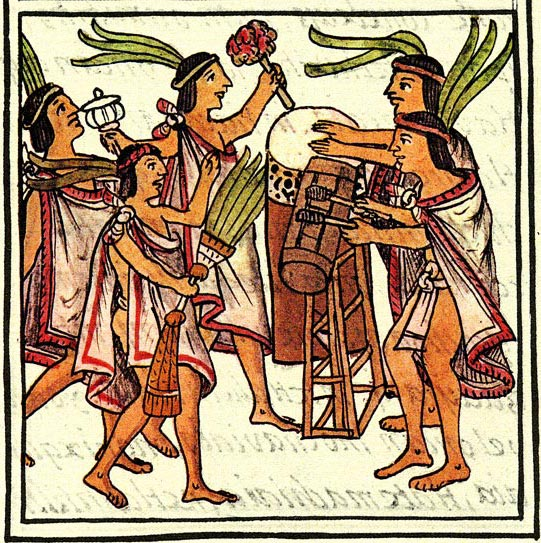
A drawing from the 16th century Florentine Codex showing a One Flower ceremony with a teponaztli (foreground) and a huehuetl (background).

- Tlapitzalli
- Ocarina
- Teponaztli
- Huehuetl
- Hom
- Carimba
- flute

=== Art ===
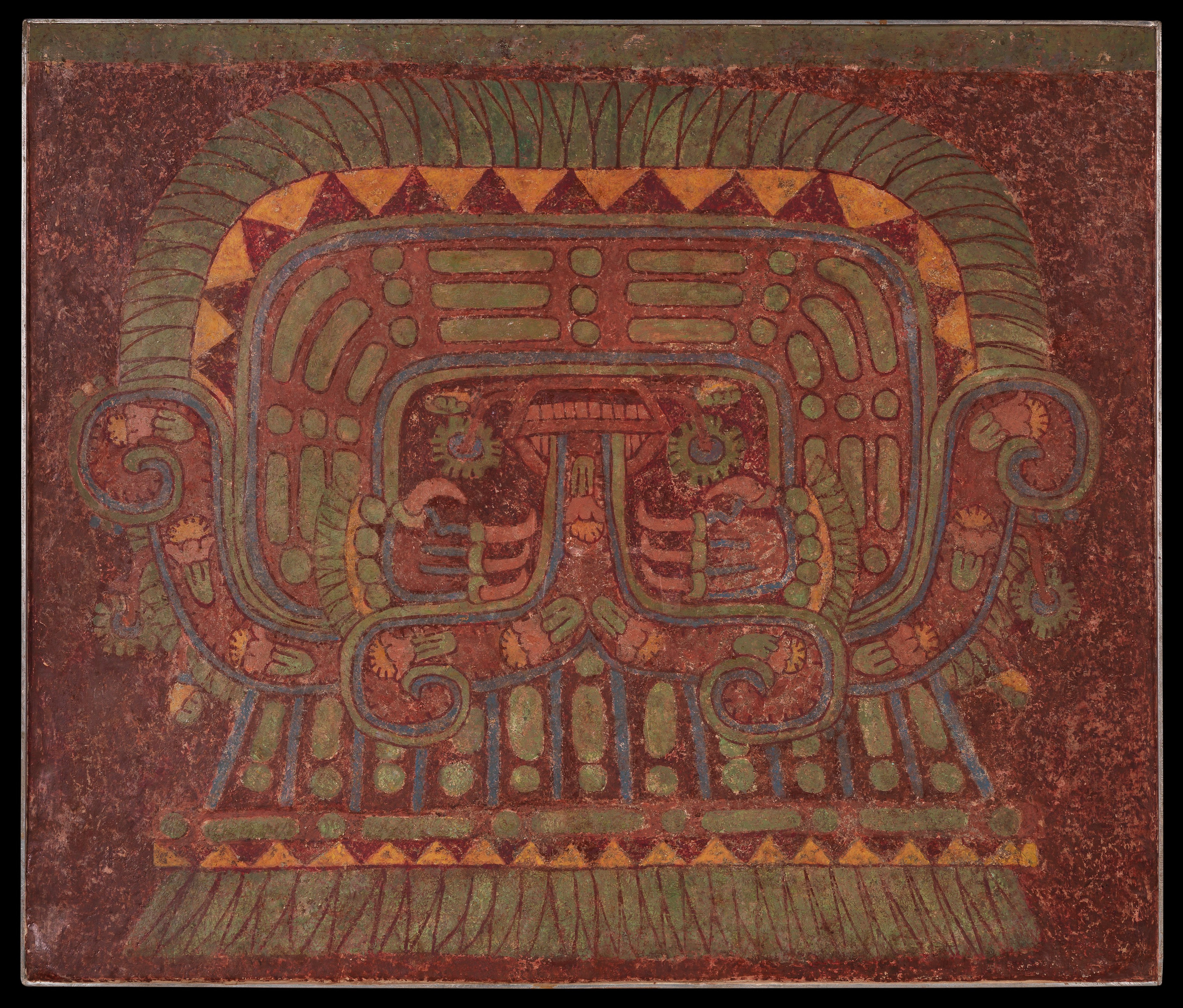
Wall painting in Teotihuacan.

- Painting – Classic period Maya paintings, found in the archaeological sites of Cacaxtla and Bonampak, are some of the most refined paintings ever to come out of the ancient Americas. Besides the Maya, other indigenous civilizations were also known for their wall paintings, including the Aztec, who developed the art of sand painting.
- Pottery – many indigenous American cultures and peoples independently invented and then refined pottery in the Americas into fine works of art, as well for utilitarian usage. The Moche and Maya were some of the best potters from the ancient Americas, and their work still inspires awe amongst us for the level of artistry, creativity, and sophistication, which such highly prized works of arts involved. Many other indigenous American cultures also developed their own pottery styles during the pre-Columbian time periods and continued to refine their artwork into the modern era.
- Maya blue

=== Calendrics ===
- Xiuhpōhualli:One of several calendars used by the Aztec, it consisted of 365 days and held great importance for religious rituals and agricultural practices.
- Mesoamerican calendars

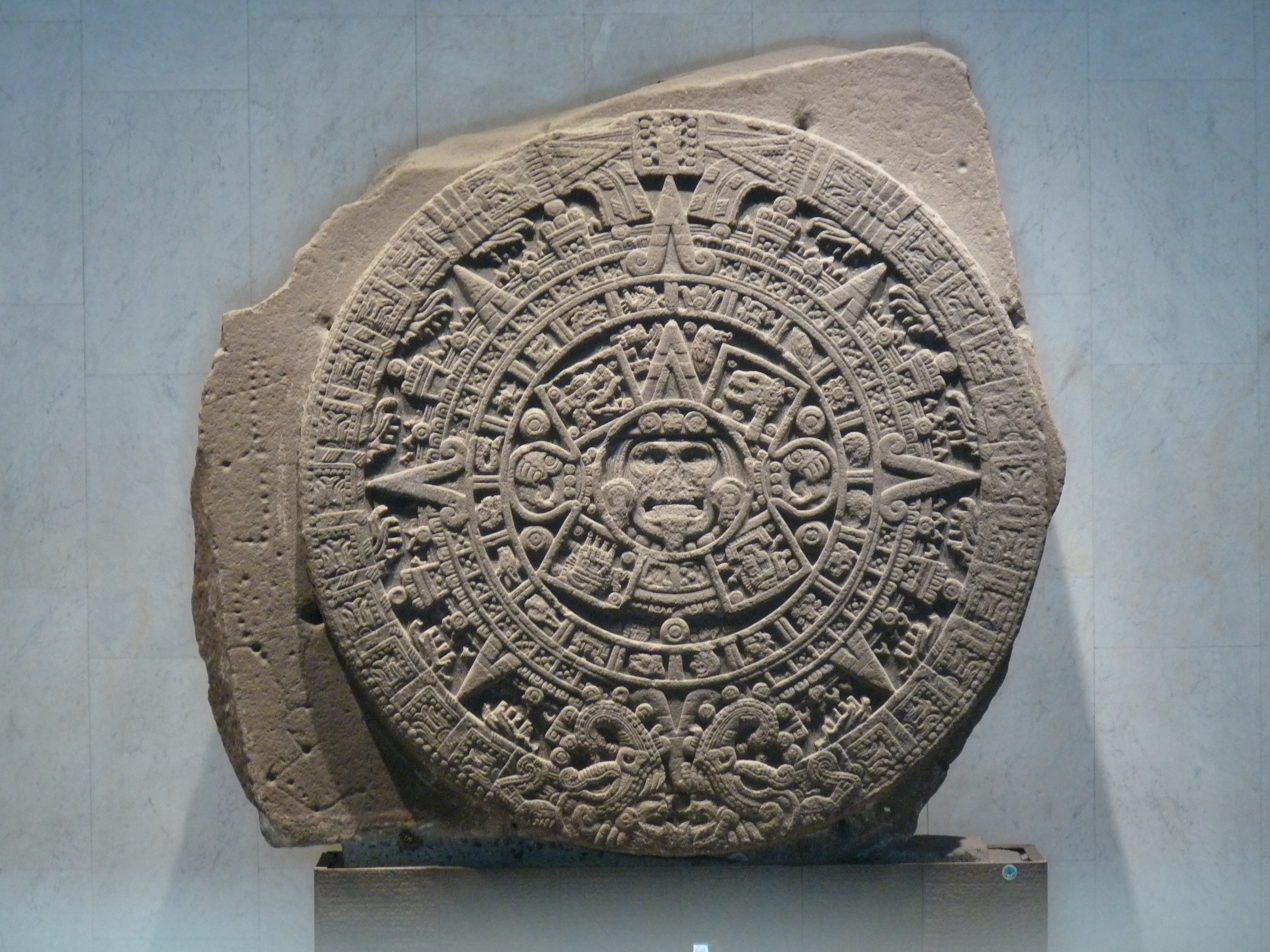
Aztec Sun stone

- Almanacs –

The earliest texts considered to be almanacs have been found in the Near East, dating back to the middle of the second millennium BC. But almanacs were invented independently by the Maya peoples. Their culture arose, and presumably began using almanacs, around 3,500 years ago, while Europeans are known to have created written almanacs only after 1150 CE. Almanacs are books containing meteorological and astronomical information, which the Maya used in various aspects of their life.

=== Engineering ===
- Aqueducts:The Aztecs constructed complex, dual-pipe aqueducts to supply their vast city of Tenochtitlan.
- Canals:the Aztecs constructed great canals used for transporting food, cargo, and relaying people to the chinampas (floating gardens used for growing food) in their great metropolis of Tenochtitlan.
- Causeway:the Aztec built many giant causeways that connected the mainland to their capital city of Tenochtitlan, located in the heart of the Aztec Empire. The causeways served as arteries used for transporting food, goods, people, captive warriors, and wastes during the heyday of the Aztec Empire in the 14th century to the 16th century.
- Dams – the Aztec in Tenochtitlan constructed great dams during the heyday of the Aztec Empire. Tenochtitlan, the capital of the Aztec empire, was first built on a small island that was located in the western section of Lake Texcoco in 1325 CE. The Aztec created various large artificial islands around the small island using a system that was similar to building the chinampas (floating gardens in the lake that was used to grow food for the cities' population). To provide drinking water to the cities' population of over a quarter of a million inhabitants, the Aztec built a system of dams that separated the salty waters of the lake from the rainwater that was accumulated during periods of heavy rains. The Aztec also used the dam to control the level of water in the lake and prevent their city from being flooded during times of heavy rains. To prevent flooding, the Aztec constructed an inner system of channels that helped to control the water level and held the level steady during flooding and periods of intense rains. Hernán Cortés, and the other Spanish conquistadors, destroyed these engineering marvels that the Aztec had developed during the previous 200 years.
- Palaces:indigenous American civilizations such as the Olmecs, Mayans, Zapotecs, Aztecs, Mixtecs, Moche, Toltecs, Inca, Chimú, Nazca and many more built elaborate palaces. The Mayan palace in Palenque is one of the best examples of Mayan palace architecture.

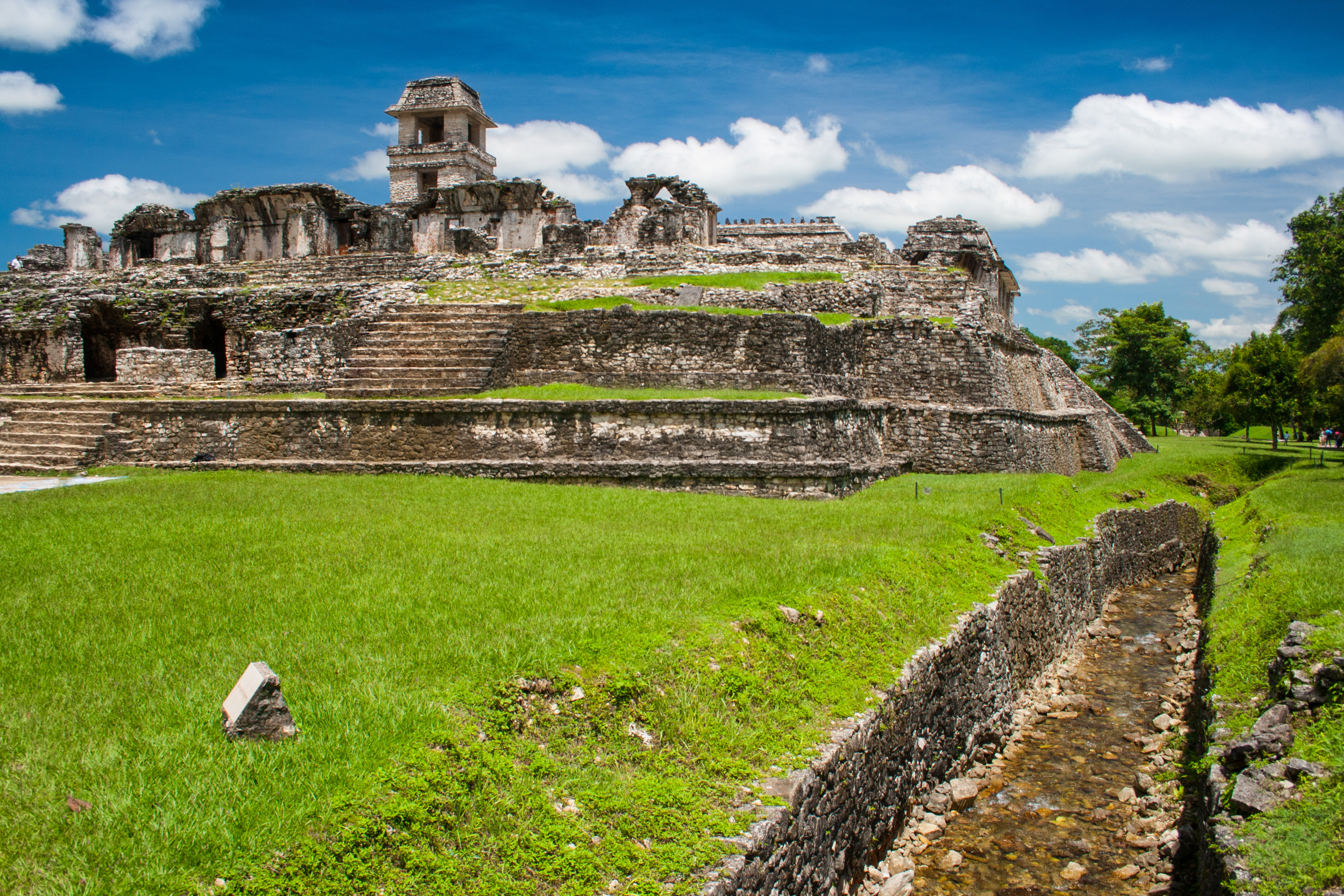
The Palace and aqueduct at Palenque

- Pyramids:advanced civilizations in Mexico, such as the Toltecs, Olmecs, Zapotecs, Aztecs, Mayans, Mixtecs, developed their own myriad styles of pyramids, usually step pyramid, which served for ceremonial/religious and administrative functions. In Mesoamerica, the largest pyramid in the world—The Great Pyramid of Cholula—began to be constructed by the inhabitants of Cholula in the 3rd century BCE. In the Andean regions, the Moches, and some ancient Peruvians also constructed gigantic pyramids as well without any influence from Old World civilizations.
- Planned city construction:Ancient cities in Mexico–such as Teotihuacan and the Aztec capital of Tenochtitlan–incorporated planned city design, including streets laid out in a grid pattern.

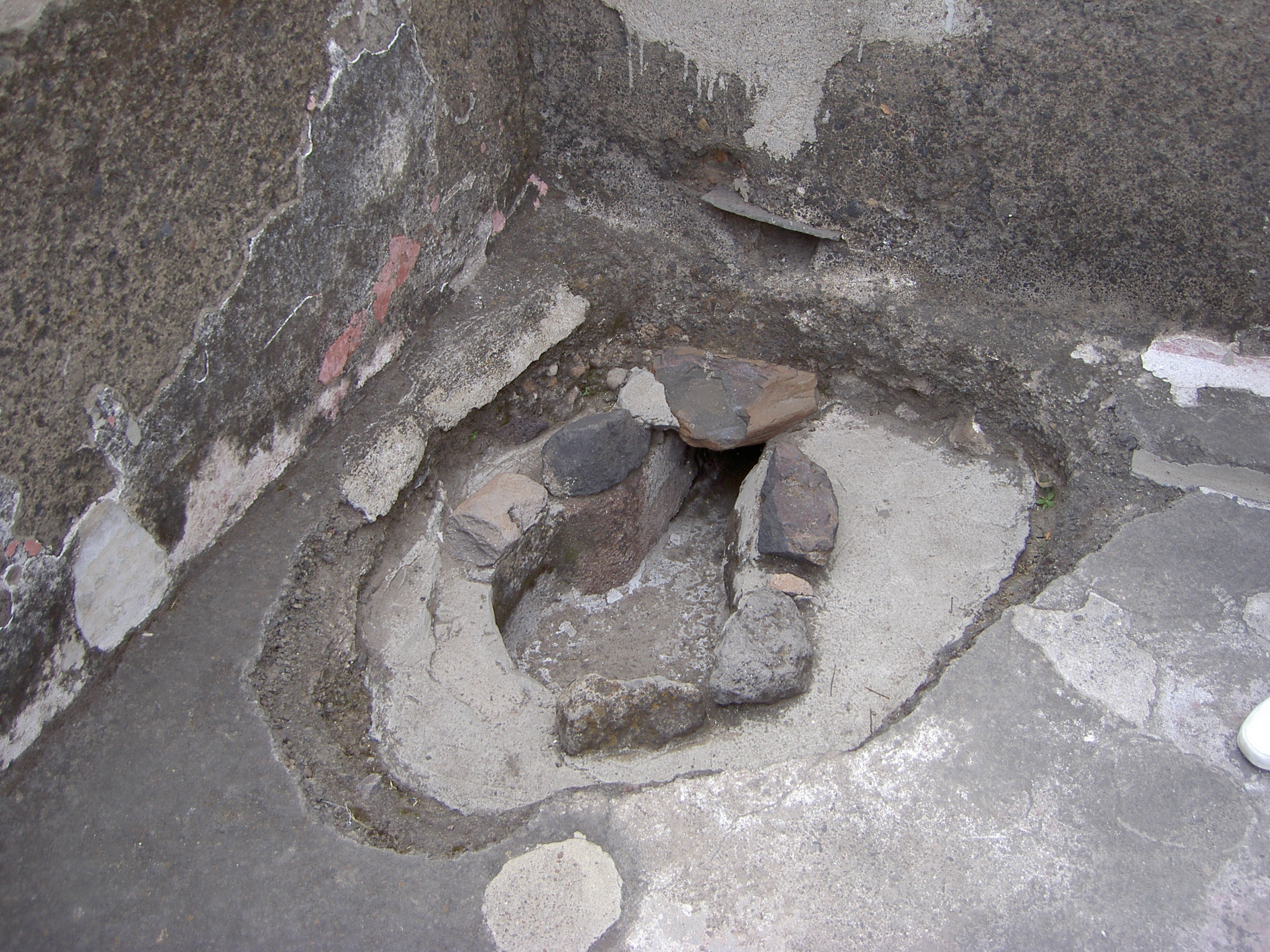
Toilet in Teotihuacan.

- Plumbing:The Maya have been found to be the earliest inventors of plumbing in Mesoamerica, with the earliest example of a pressurized water system being constructed in 750 CE—or earlier. This pressurized water system was located in the Maya site of Palenque, where public baths and toilets were accessible to the residents of the ancient city.
- Wheel and axle:Mesoamericans invented wheels but only used these as toys. The oldest wheeled figure to have been uncovered in Mesoamerica is a crowned, dog-like figure in Tres Zapotes, Veracruz, dated ca. 100–200 CE. The most common examples of the Mesoamerican wheel and axle are Aztec clay wheeled toys.

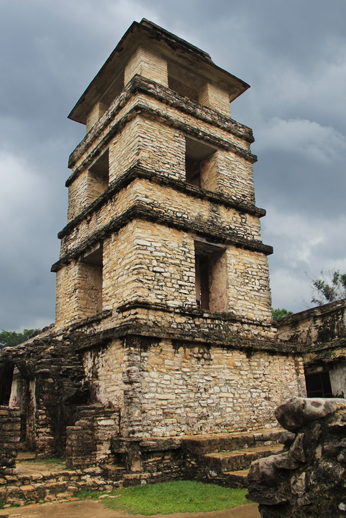
The Palace Observation Tower at Palenque.

- Observatories:Mesoamerican astronomers constructed towers to observe the movements of the planets and other astronomical features and events. Although culture groups throughout the world have observed the planets and stars and recorded their movements, the stone structures of the Mesoamerican and Andean culture groups are significant because they show the emphasis these early astronomers placed on making clear and accurate observations. The most notable example of Maya astronomical observatories is Caracol, in Chichén Itzá. In 1975, archaeoastronomers Anthony F. Aveni and Horst Hartung surveyed the site and suggested that ancient Maya astronomers used the structure to observe the planet Venus. The Maya, as well as other Mesoamerican culture groups, used Venus to set times for ceremonies and as a divination tool.

=== Metal production ===
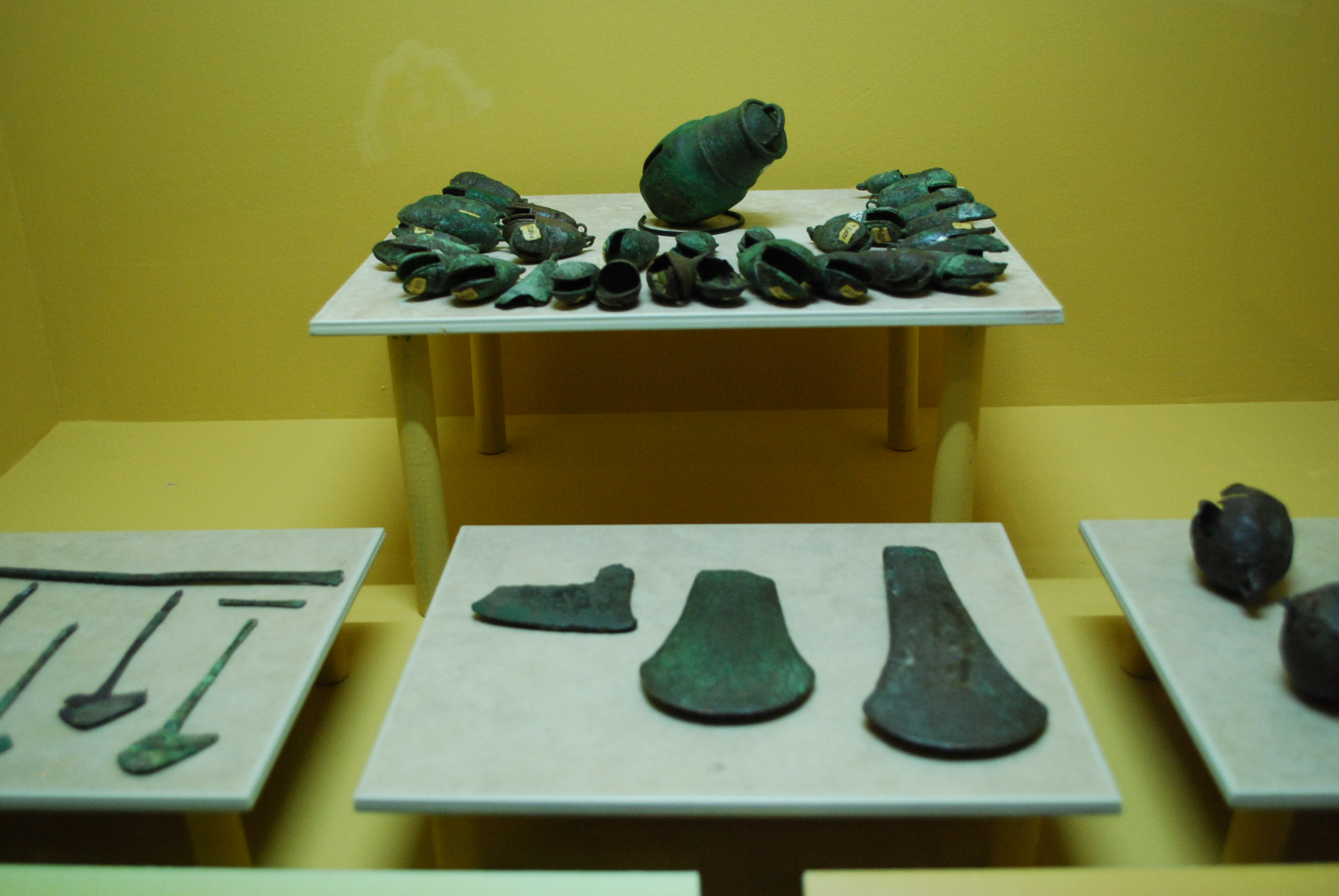
Copper bells, axe heads and ornaments from various parts of Chiapas (1200–1500) on display at the Regional Museum in Tuxtla Gutierrez, Chiapas.

- Metallurgy in pre-Columbian Mesoamerica:The emergence of metallurgy in pre-Columbian Mesoamerica occurred relatively late in the region's history, with distinctive works of metal apparent in West Mexico by roughly AD 800, and perhaps as early as AD 600. Metallurgical techniques likely diffused northward from regions in Central or South America via maritime trade routes; recipients of these metallurgical technologies apparently exploited a wide range of material, including alloys of copper-silver, copper-arsenic, copper-tin and copper-arsenic-tin.

=== Navigation ===
The Olmec may have developed compasses for navigation and astronomical study that were made out of lodestones.

=== Games and entertainment ===
- Patolli
- Balloons: Invented by the Olmec.
- Spinning top: Known from Mesoamerican times. A device used as a toy and made out of wood.

=== Food preparation ===
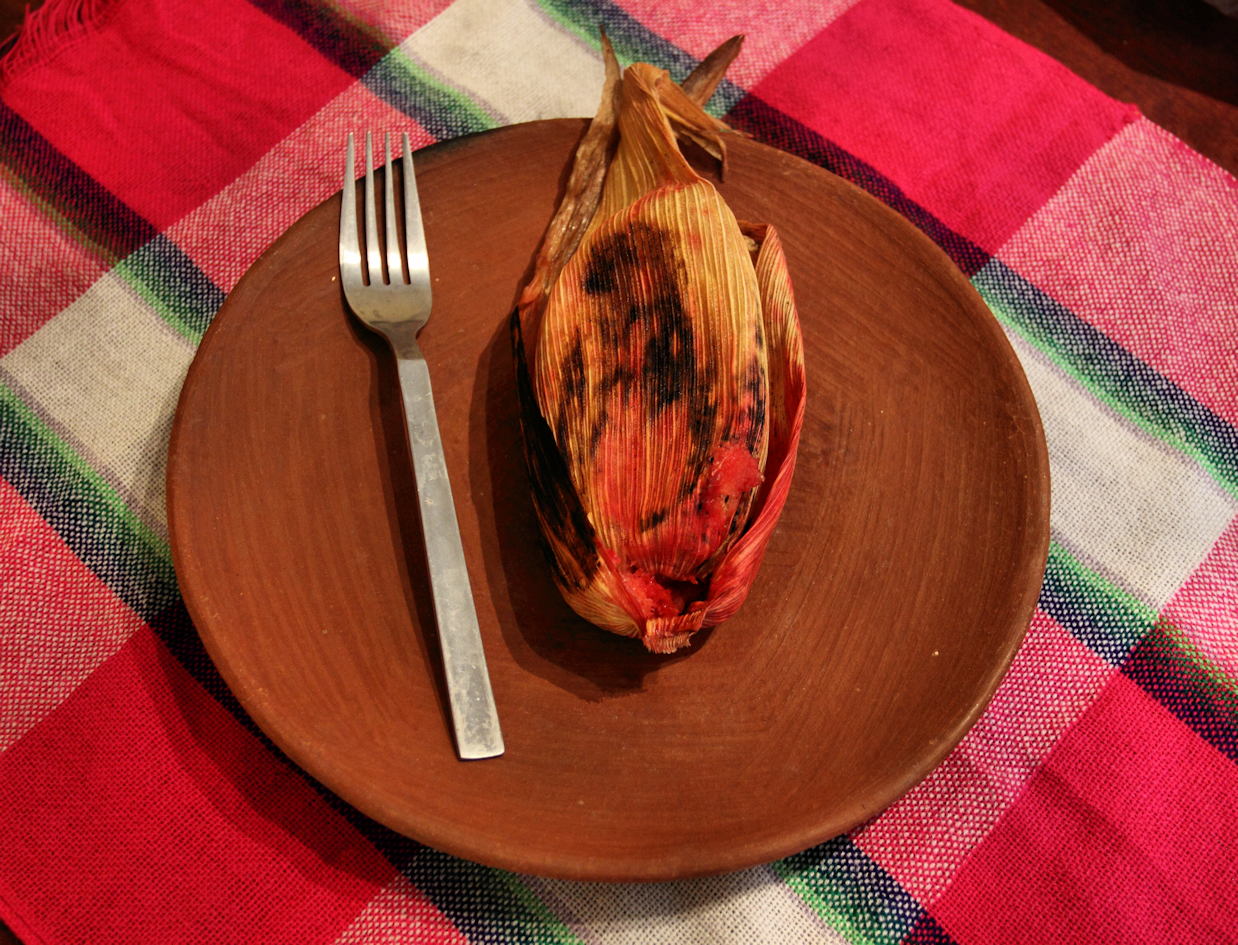
A tamal dulce breakfast tamal from Oaxaca, Mexico. It contains pineapple, raisins and blackberries.

- Nixtamalization
- Salsa
- Tomato sauce
- taco
- Pozole
- Burrito
- Atole
- tortillas
- Tostada
- Pozol
- tamales
- Nopales
- Tlacoyo
- Chapulines
- Popcorn: First invented by the Zapotec and later introduced to Hernán Cortés by the Aztec
- Guacamole: The name comes from an Aztec dialect via Nahuatl āhuacamolli [aːwakaˈmolːi], which literally translates to avocado puree.
- Chocolate: Believed to have been invented by the Olmec from cocoa beans, both the Mayan and the Aztec drank it hot, thus creating the hot chocolate.

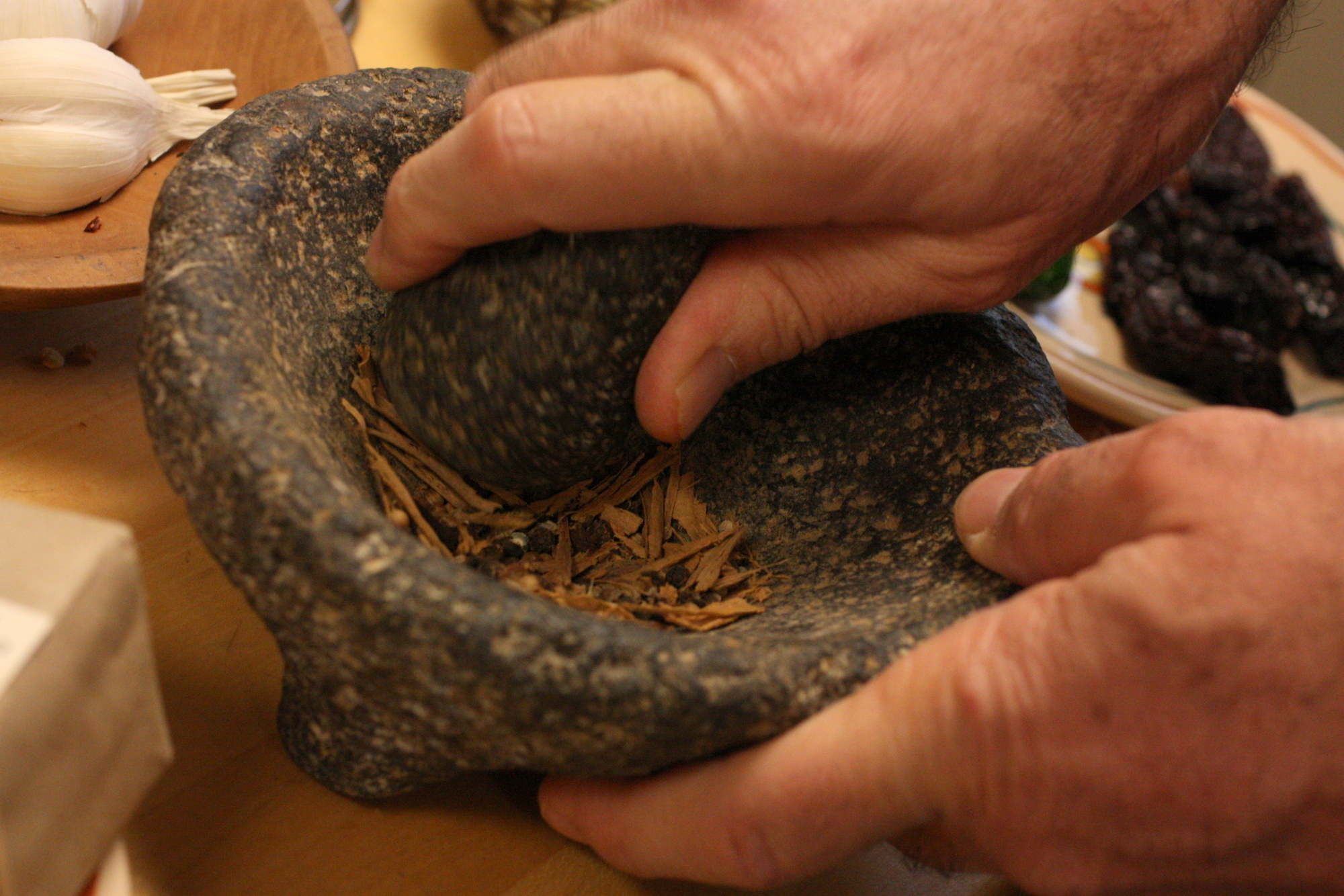
Molcajete used to grind spices

- Molcajete
- Metate
- Comal
- Molinillo
- Tortilla press
- Petate

=== Crops and cultivation ===
- Chia seed

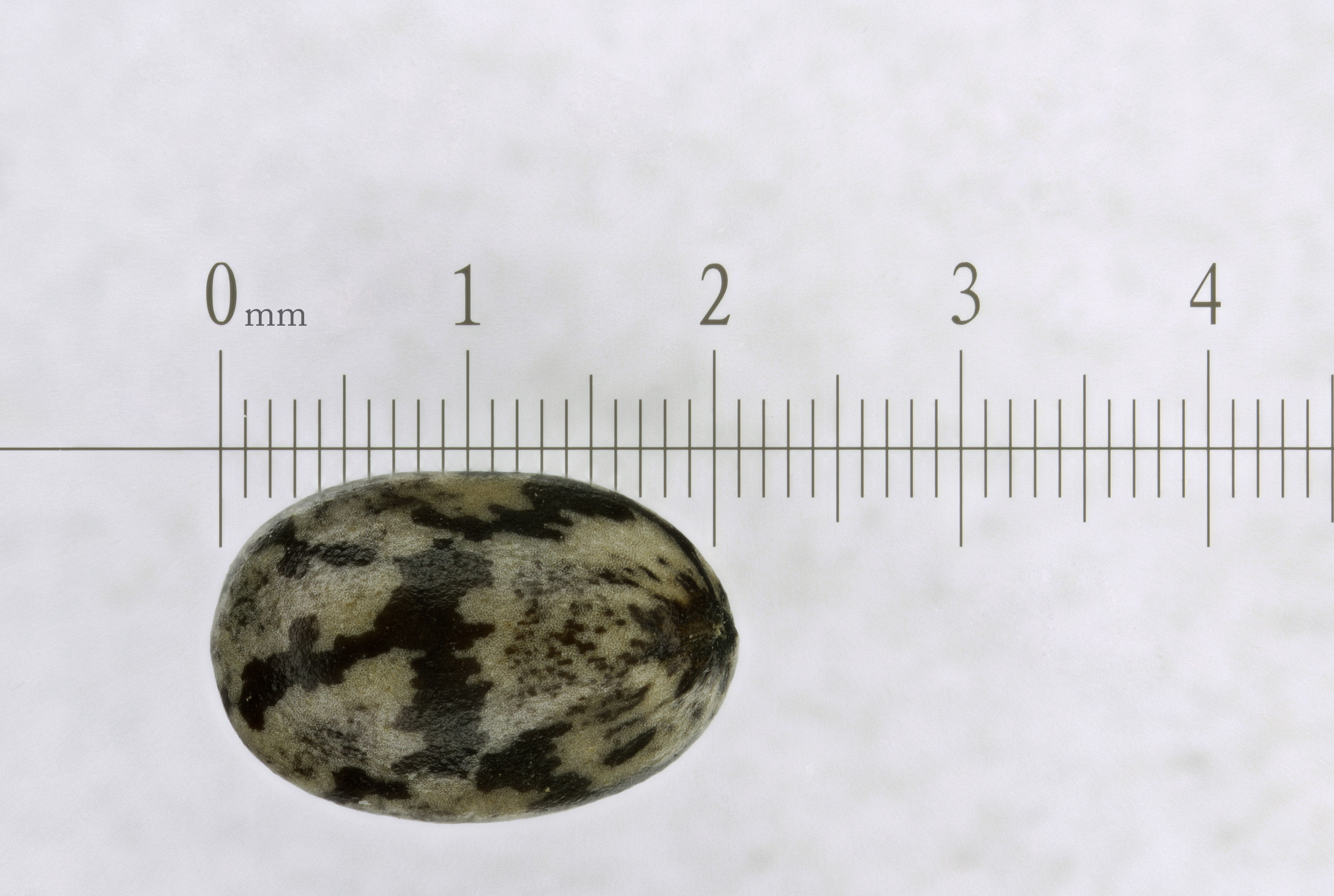
Chia seed measuring 2 mm

- Guava
- Rubus
- Sweet potato (possibly)
- Papaya
- Cocoa bean
- sunflower seed
- Squash
- Beans
- Pachyrhizus erosus

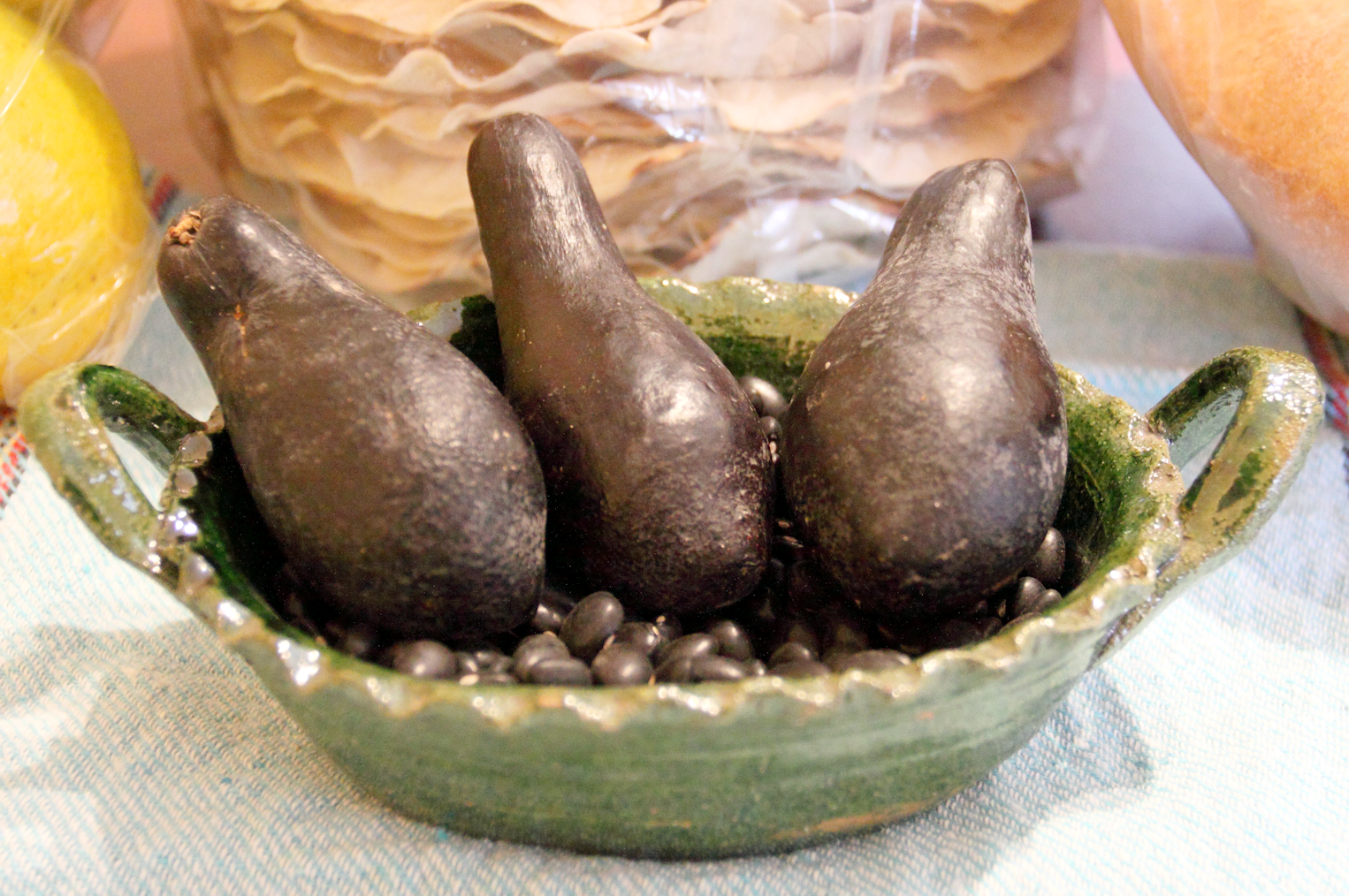
Native Oaxaca criollo avocados, the ancestral form of today's domesticated varieties

- Avocado
- Chaya
- Chili pepper
- Potatoes
- Tomatoes
- Yuca
- Corn: First cultivated by the Olmec and Maya.

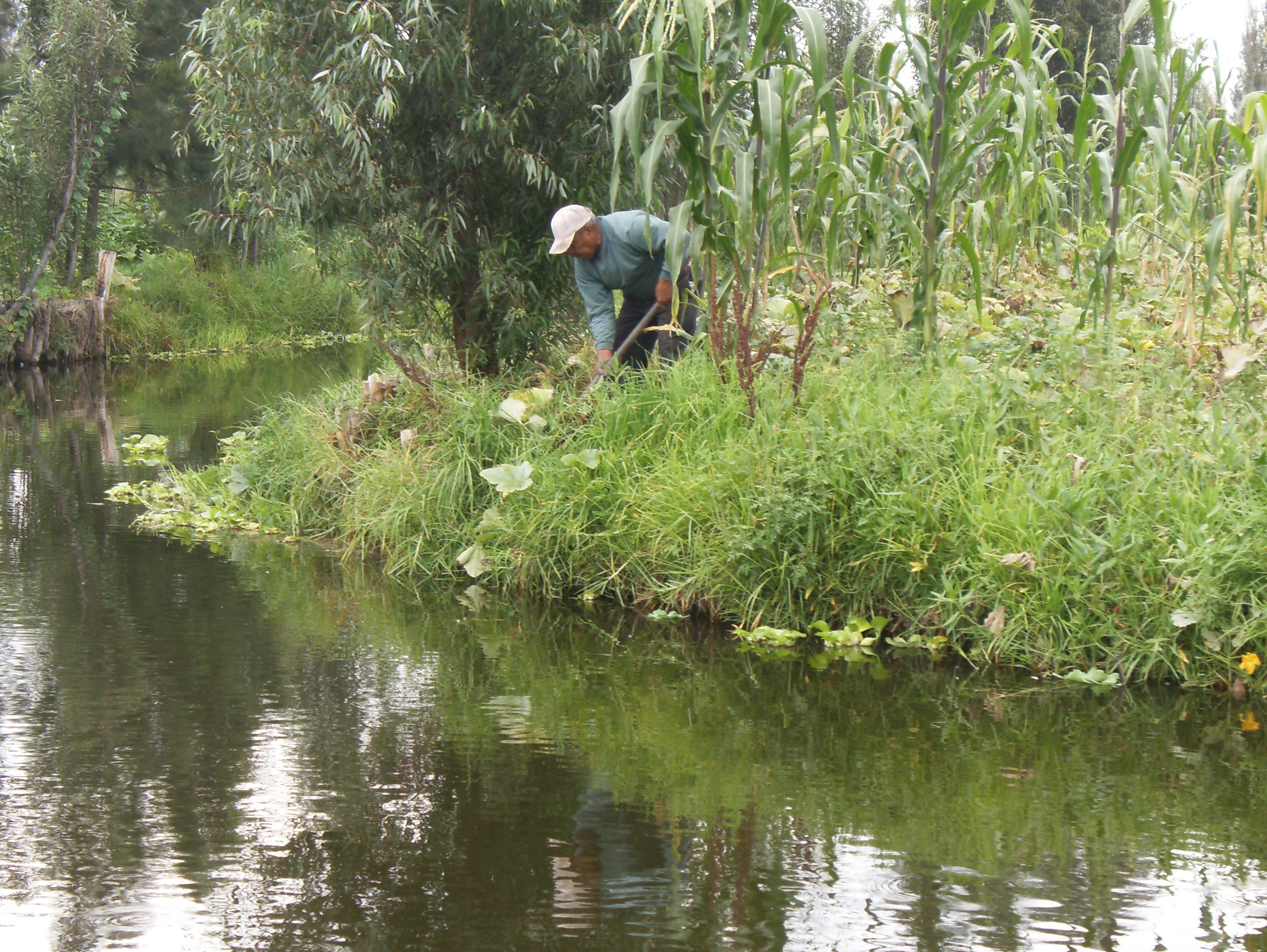
One of the remaining chinampas in Xochimilco

- Vanilla: the Totonac are believed to have been the first to extract vanilla from the pods of vanilla orchids and use it as a flavor enhancer.
- Cotton
- Sisal production invented by the Maya.
- Tobacco
- Bottle gourds – the ancient Mexicans learned to first cultivate bottle gourds around 8,000 BCE. Indigenous peoples grew bottle gourds for use as bowls, scoops, colanders, ladles, spoons, canteens, and dippers. Larger gourds were used as cooking vessels.
- Chinampa: Invented in central Mexico around 600 CE

=== Livestock ===
- Turkey (bird):Approximately 2,000 years ago, ancient Mesoamericans domesticated the turkey during the Late Preclassic period—from 300 BCE to 100 CE.

=== Fashion ===
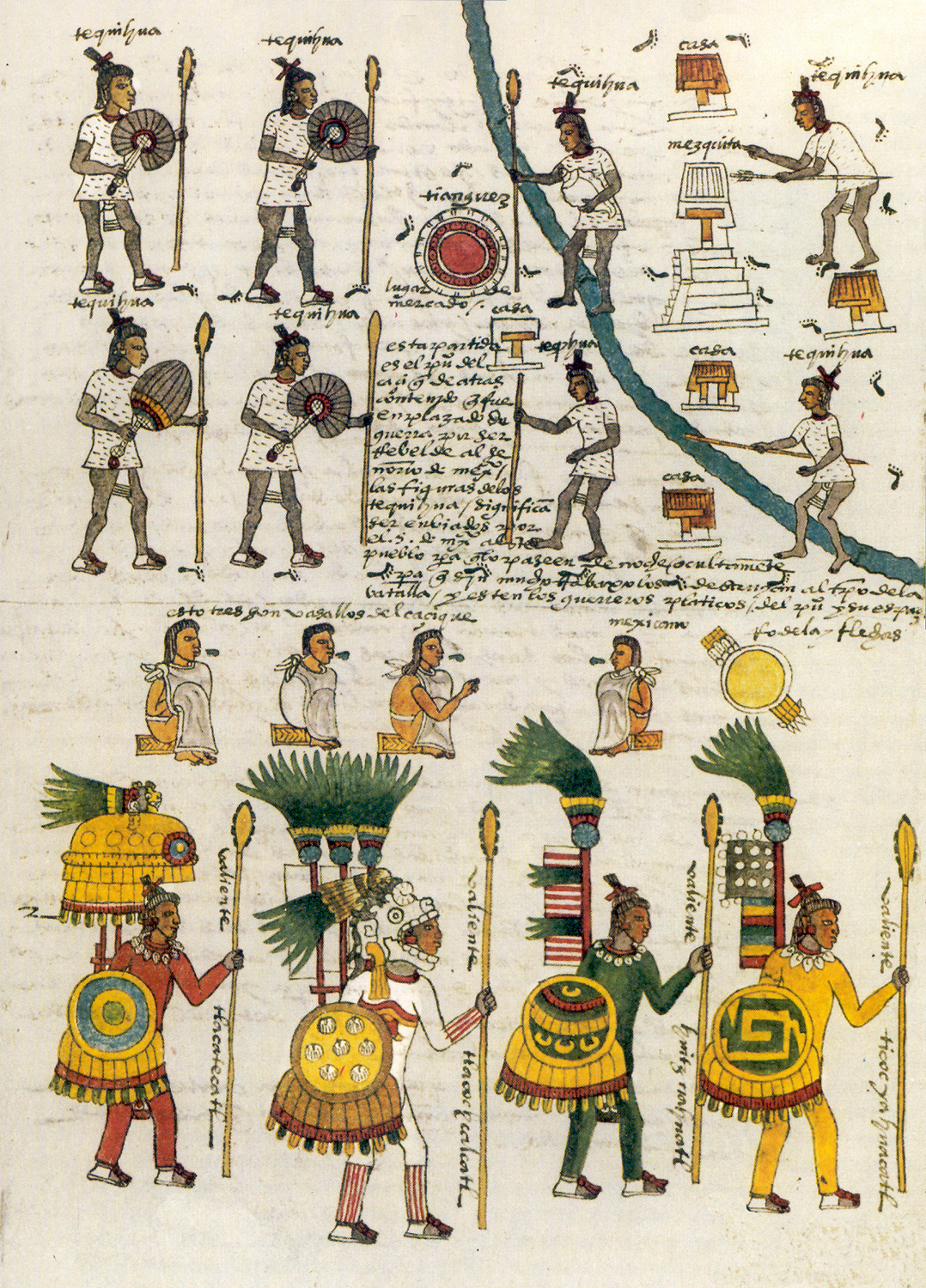
Page from the Codex Mendoza depicting warriors wearing Ichcahuipilli armor, and wielding fans and tepozli(spears).

- Huipil
- Umbrellas:independent of the ancient Chinese (who had also invented the umbrellas on their own), the Maya and the Inca had invented circular umbrellas, which were made from bird feathers.
- Hand Fan:The Aztecs developed circular handheld fans made of feathers and other materials that served as a status symbol, and were used for warfare activities.

=== Dog breeds ===
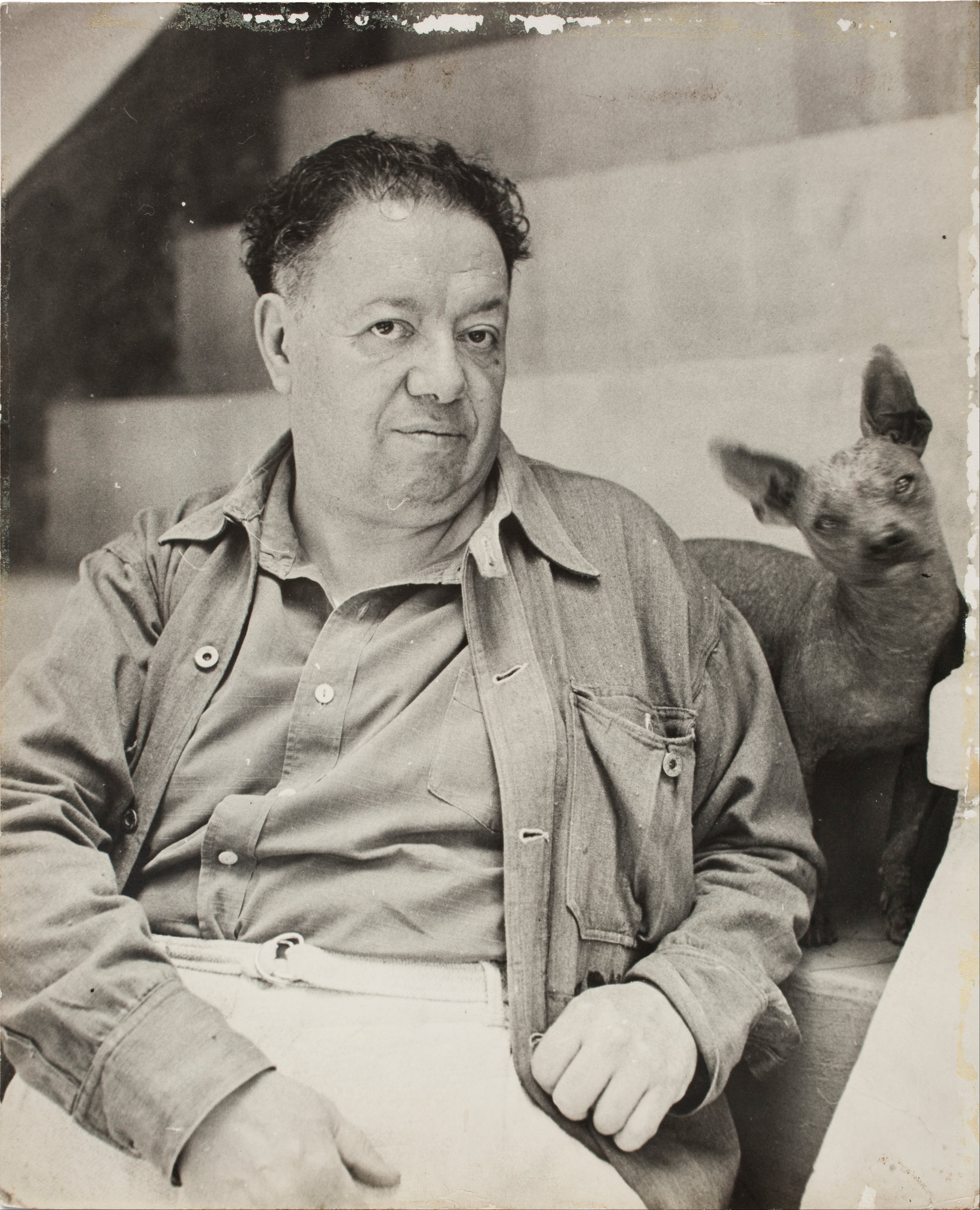
Artist Diego Rivera with a Xoloitzquintle at the Casa Azul

- xochiocoyotl (coyote), xoloitzcuintli (known as xolo or Mexican hairless),
- chihuahua

=== Body armor ===
- Bulletproof vest:Ichcahuipilli, was a military armor used by various Mesoamerican cultures. It consisted of a layered cotton shirt, at least 2 inches thick, hardened with brine and other substances. It was originally intended to protect the wearer against projectiles and other weaponry, such as spears, arrows, and obsidian swords, but later was discovered to be capable of stopping musket shots.

=== Dentistry ===
- Tooth transplantion: First practiced by the Maya.

=== Medication ===
- Antispasmodic medication, invented by the Aztecs.
- Ephedra:the Aztecs used ephedra in order to treat common colds. Unlike the Chinese version of the ephedra, the New World ephedra that was used by the indigenous Americans contained milder alkaloids.
- Antibiotics: The Aztecs developed antibiotic treatments by cultivating fungi on tortillas.

Aztec Herbal Medicines
Botanical name	Nahuatl name	Uses
Artemisia mexicana	Itztuahyatl	Weakness, colic, reduce fever; coughing
Bocconia frutescens	Cococxihuitl	Constipation, abscesses, swelling
Bromelia pinguin	Mexocotl	heat blisters in the mouth
Carica papaya	Chichihualxo-chitl	Latex unripe fruit for rash ulcer; ripe fruit digestive
Casimiroa edulis	Cochitzapotl	sedative
Cassia occidentalis or Cassia alata	Totoncaxihuitl	Astringent, purgative, anthelmintic, relieves fever, inflammation of rashes
Chenopodium graveolens	Epazotl	Against dysentery, anthelmintic, helps asthmatics breathe
Euphorbia calyculata	Cuauhtepatli; chupiri	Purgative, skin ailments, mange, skin sores
Helianthus annuus	Chilamacatl	fever
Liquidambar styraciflua	Ocotzotl; xochiocotzotl quanhxihuitl	Rashes, toothache, tonic for stomach
Montanoa tomentosa	Cihuapatli	Diuretic, oxytocic, cures hydropesia
Passiflora jorullensis	Coanenepilli	Causes sweating, Diuretic, pain reliever, poisons and snake bites
Perezia adnata	Pipitzahuac	Purgative, cathartic, coughing, sore throat
Persea americana	Auacatl; ahuaca quahuitl	Astringent, treat sores, remove scars
Pithecolobium dulce	Quamochitl	Astringent, causes sneezing, cures ulcers and sores
Plantago mexicana	Acaxilotic	Vomit and cathartic
Plumbago pulchella	Tlepatli; tletlematil; itzcuinpatli	Diuretic, colic, gangrene
Psidium guajava	Xalxocotl	Digestion, dysentery, mange
Rhamnus serrata	Tlalcapulin	Dysentery, bloody bowels
Salix lasiopelis	Quetzalhuexotl	Stops blood from rectum, cures fever
Schoenocaulon coulteri; Veratrum frigidum	Zoyoyatic	Causes sneezing, kills mice/lice/flies
Smilax atristolochiaefolia	Mecapatli	Causes sweating, diuretic, relieves joint pain
Tagetes erecta	Cempohualxochitl	Causes sweating, cathartic, cures dropsy
Talauma mexicana	yolloxochitl	Comforts heart, used against sterility
Theobroma cacao	Cacahuaquahuitl	Excess diarrhea, can cause dizziness

=== Math ===
- Number 0, invented by the Maya or possibly the Olmec.

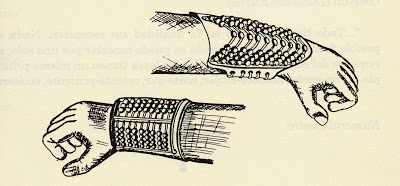
An illustration of the Pre-Columbian abacus: the Nepohualtzintzin

- The ancient Mexicans also developed complex arithmetic functions and operations such as additions, subtractions, divisions, and multiplications. The development of mathematics by the Mexicans assisted them in making sense of the universe, cosmos, astronomy, architecture, and pre-Columbian calendars that were so essential in maintaining a connection between them and the gods and heavens.
- Abacus – The Aztec and Maya of Mesoamerica performed arithmetic operations using an abacus. It served as a more accurate and faster alternative to a written solution or relying on memory. Archaeologists have recorded the Mesoamerican abacus, or Nepohualtzintzin, as being present in Mesoamerica from at least between 900 and 1000 CE.

=== Sports ===
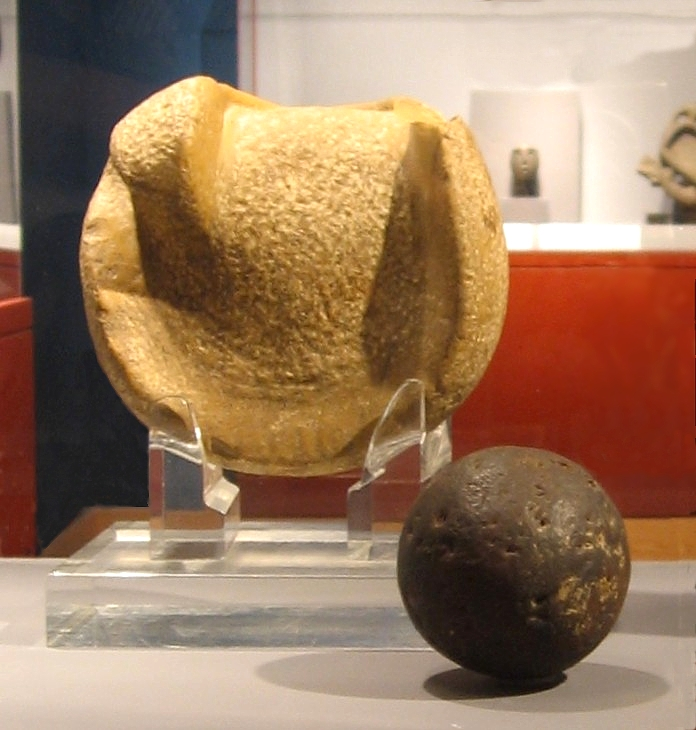
A solid rubber ball used (or similar to those used) in the Mesoamerican ballgame, 300 BCE to 250 CE, Kaminaljuyu. The ball is 3 inches (almost 8 cm) in diameter, a size that suggests it was used to play a handball game. Behind the ball is a manopla, or handstone, which was used to strike the ball, 900 BCE to 250 CE, also from Kaminaljuyu.

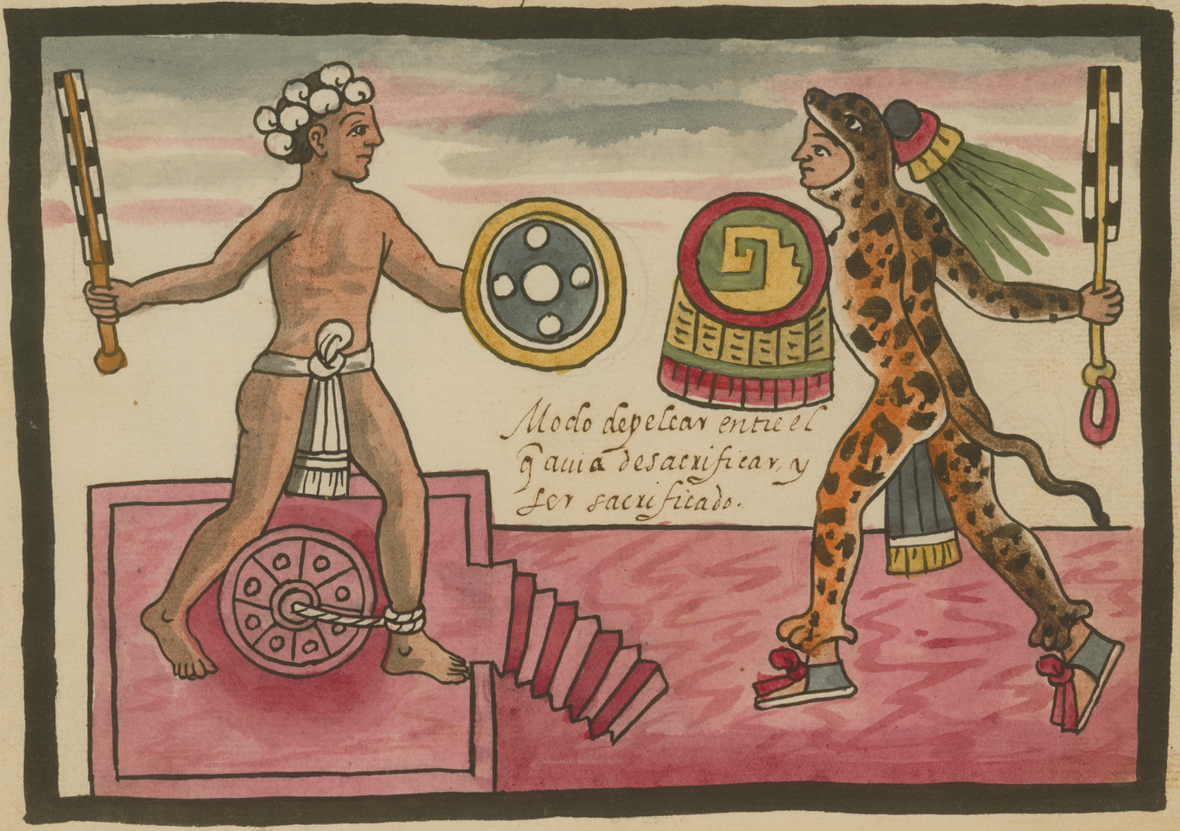
This page from the Codex Tovar depicts a scene of gladiatorial sacrificial rite, celebrated on the festival of Tlacaxipehualiztli.

- Rubber ball: Before 1600 BCE by the Olmec for uncertain purposes and later used by the Mayan and Aztec for ball games.
- Mesoamerican ballgame: Played differently by the Mayan and the Aztec, it is believed to be one of the first ball games, if not the first.
- Pelota purépecha
- Pelota mixteca
- Xhupa Porrazo: A form of wrestling and martial arts training developed by the Zapotec people. It is still practiced today mainly in Oaxaca Mexico.
- Boxing: The Maya practiced a form boxing in which they wore conch shells as gloves and wooden helmets.
- Gladiatorial combat: The Aztecs practiced a form of gladiatorial rite that served as an spectator sport and holy ritual.

=== Behavioral products ===
- Chewing gum ancient Aztecs used chile as a base for making a gum-like substance and to stick objects together in everyday use. Women, in particular, used this type of gum as a mouth freshener.
- Tobacco smoking
- Smoking pipe:indigenous Americans invented the smoking pipe and in particular the ceremonial pipe a type of tobacco pipe. This was an unknown concept to Europeans and the idea was adopted by them and was shortly thereafter brought to the Chinese.

=== Chemical ===
- Processing of rubber latex as rubber: Although vulcanization with heat or sulfur was neither known nor practised, mesoamerican peoples used the juice of the morning glory vine to similarly cross-link raw rubber and make it usable.

=== Social ===
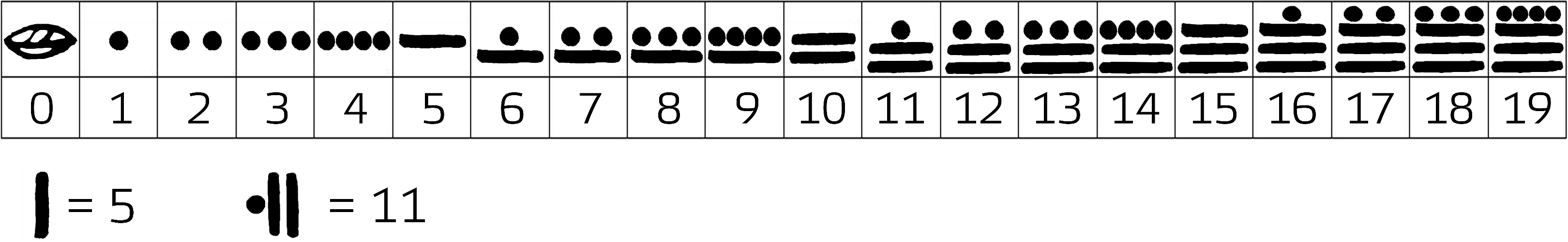
List of Maya numerals from 0 to 19 with underneath two vertically oriented examples

- Universal education: The Aztecs were the first civilization known to have introduced compulsory education for both boys and girls.
- Writing system:Many indigenous American cultures, such as the Olmec, Maya, Aztec, Zapotec, and Toltec, developed writing systems.

=== Commerce ===
- Tianguis: the open air market, considered to have been a direct influence on today's flea market.

=== Alcoholic beverages ===
- Pulque
- Agave wine – This wine is made from the same plant, blue agave, as is tequila, but with a lower alcohol content.

=== Health and hygiene ===
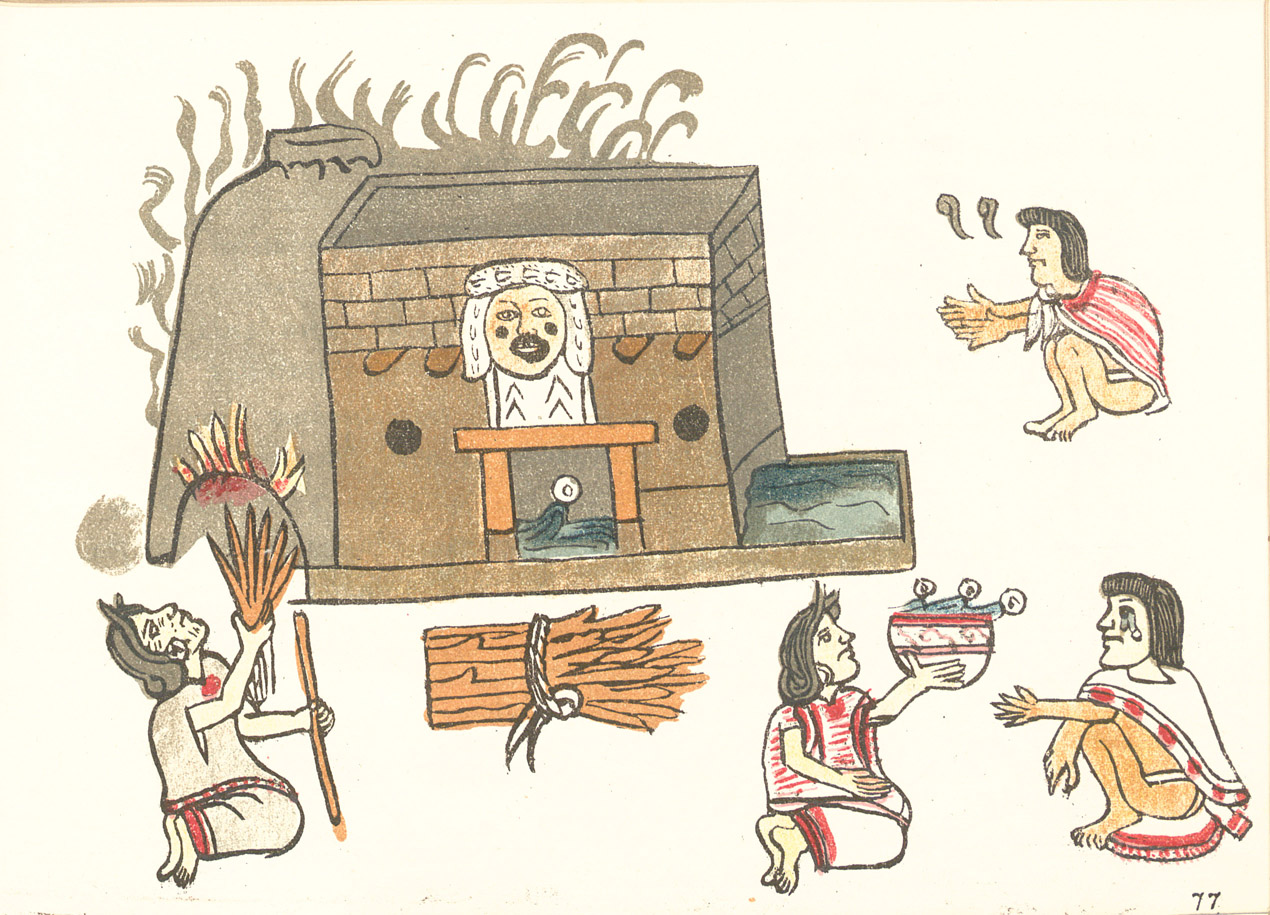
Pictogram of an Aztec temazcal in the Codex Magliabechiano

- Sauna: The temazcal was the first ever sweat lodge, used by many cultures in Mesoamerica.

=== Astronomy ===
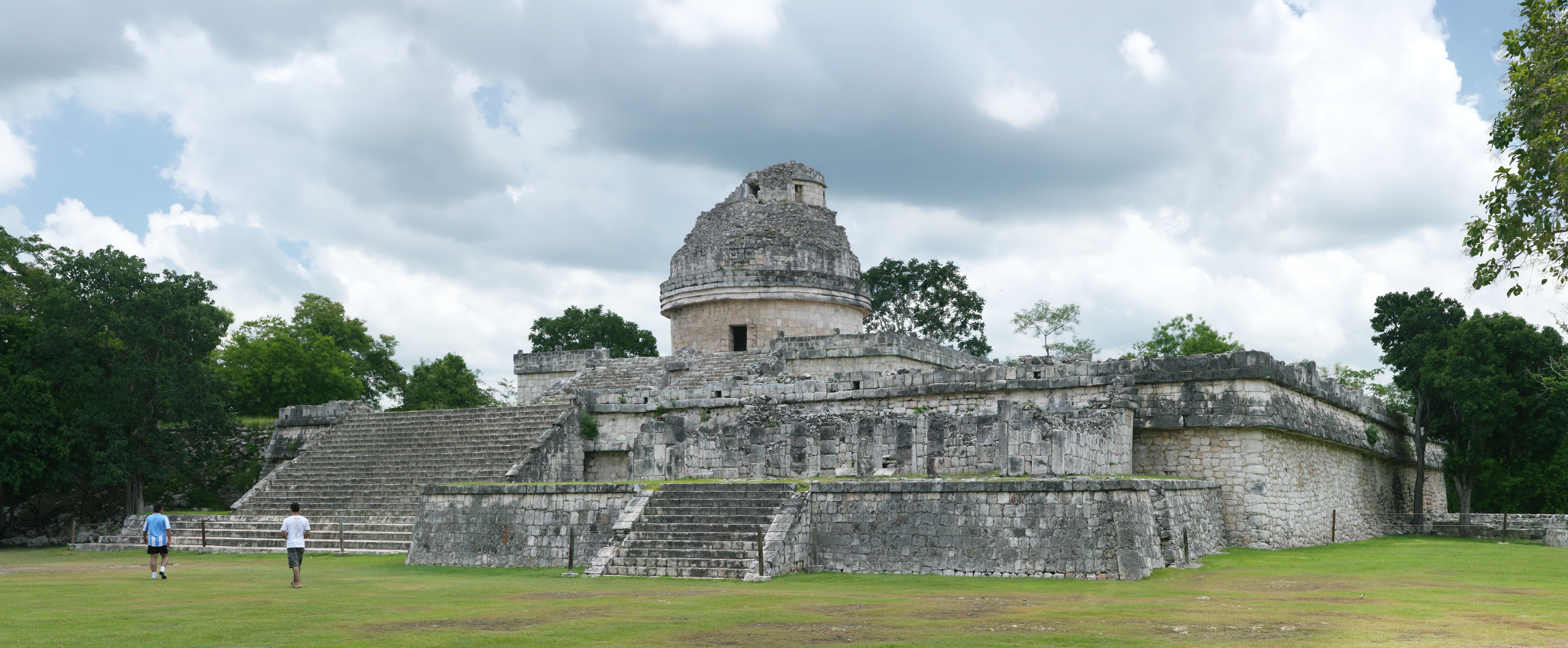
Maya observatory: El Caracol

- Mesoamerican cultures, such as the Maya and Aztec, were able to accurately predict astronomical events, like eclipses, hundreds of years into the future.

== Colonial ==
=== Industrial ===
- Automated cigarette machine: invented by Juan Nepomuceno Adorno in 1846.
- Ballcock: Invented by José Antonio de Alzate y Ramírez in 1790.
- Flattop grill: originated in 19th century Mexico and Central America.

=== Economy ===
Spanish dollar coin minted in Mexico City c. 1809

- Coin lathe:Developed in 1774 by José Damián Ortiz de Castro.
- Real de a 8, also known as "Spanish American peso", "Spanish dollar" or "piece of eight", considered to be the first world currency, which also gave the origin of the dollar or peso sign ($), was a Spanish/Mexican invention, it was first used in New Spain before being widely used in the whole Americas, parts of Europe and the Far East. It also provided the model for the currency that the United States adopted in 1792 and the larger coins of the new Spanish American republics such as the Mexican peso and the Philippine peso in Southeast Asia.

=== Food ===
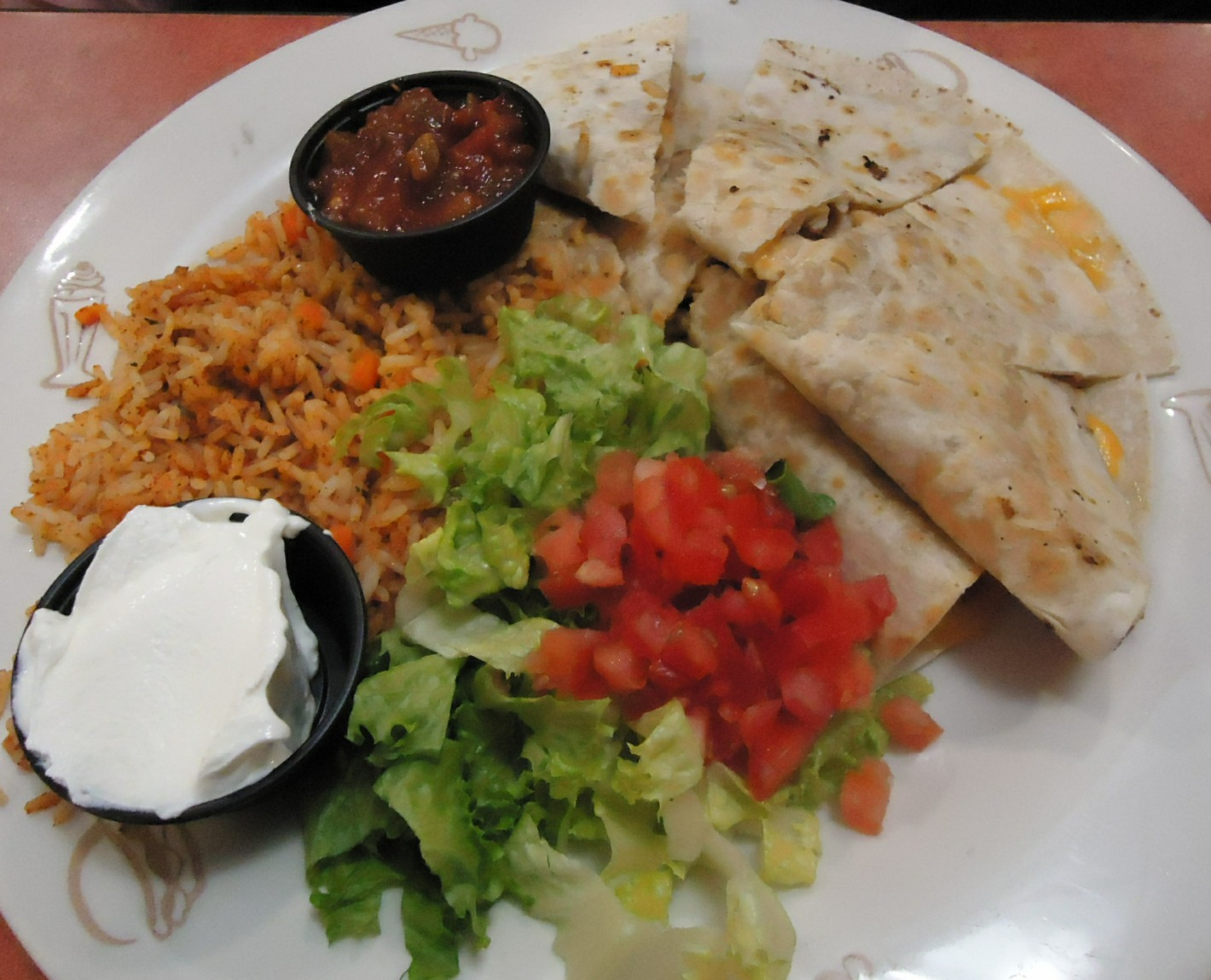
Quesadillas served at a Friendly's restaurant in New Jersey

- Cajeta
- Chile relleno
- Enchilada
- Mole sauce
- Champurrado
- Quesadilla
- Carnitas

=== Music and musical instruments ===
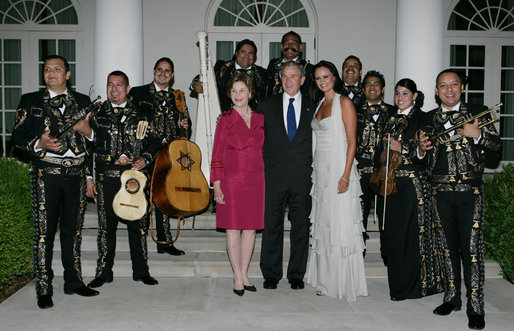
George and Laura Bush at the White House with Mariachi Campanas de América.

- Pirekua
- Corridos
- Ranchera
- Mariachi: originated in Guadalajara.
- Jarabe Tapatío
- Vihuela, a five string musical instrument.

=== Alcoholic beverages ===
- Mezcal.
- Rompope, an alcoholic beverage made with eggs, milk, and vanilla flavouring, originated in the convents of Puebla de los Ángeles.
- Tequila.

=== Sports ===
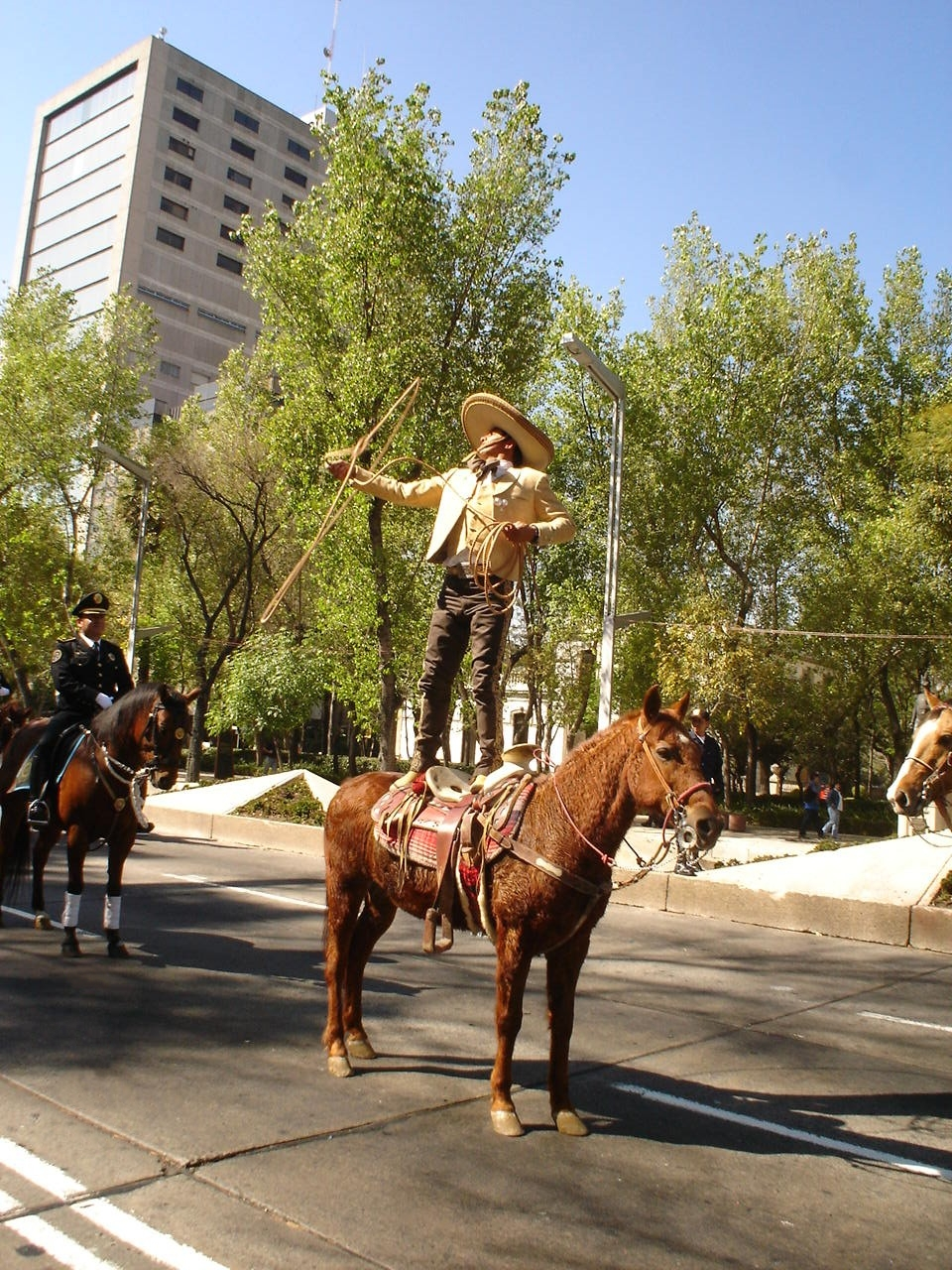
A Charro making a risky "suerte" (Trick).

- Lienzo charro
- Charreada
- Rodeo
- Jaripeo
- Lucha Libre
- Baseball:In 1847, American soldiers played what may have been the first baseball game in Mexico at Parque Los Berros in Xalapa, Veracruz. A few days after the Battle of Cerro Gordo, they used the "wooden leg captured (by the Fourth Illinois regiment) from General Santa Anna".

=== Fashion ===
- Sombrero.
- Mexican pink.
- Serape.
- Quechquemitl.

=== Chemical ===
- Patio process: For removal of silver from ore.
- Ursolic acid: Discovered by Dr. Leopoldo del Rio de la Losa in 1841.

== Modern ==
=== Construction and civil engineering ===
- Translucent concrete (ILum): developed by students Joel Sosa Gutierrez and Sergio Galvan in 2005.

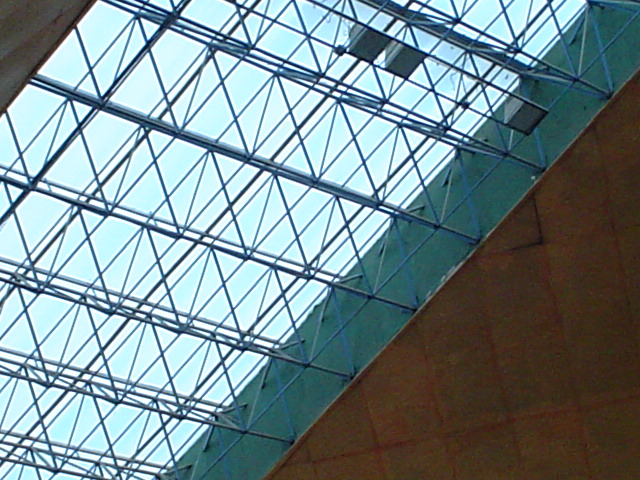
A tridilosa, in the ceiling of the Terminal Central de Autobuses del Norte, Mexico

- Tridilosa: invented by civil engineer Heberto Castillo.
- Anti-graffiti coating (Deletum 3000): developed in the early 2000s at UNAM’s Applied Physics and Advanced Technology Centre in Querétaro Mexico.
- Earthquake Resistant Foundations: invented by engineer Manuel González Flores in 1945.
- Continuous-flow intersections were first invented by Mexican engineer Francisco Mier.
- Breakwater (structure): engineer Mauricio Porras developed a way to build docks and wave breakers using bags filled with sand or concrete and arranging them in 6' by 19' configurations in 1996. Thus creating a cheaper more material effective way of building these structures.

=== Chemical ===
- Sponge iron reaction (HYL process): created by Hylsa (now Ternium) of Mexico in 1957.
- Solid rain (Lluvia sólida): invented by chemical engineer Sergio Jesús Rico Velasco, it consist of a farming additive that cuts down on irrigation needs by employing hydrogel.

=== Antidotes ===
- Scorpion antivenom, developed by Alejandro Alagón Cano in 1994.
- Coralmyn, one of several antivenoms created by the Instituto Bioclon

=== Pharmaceutical ===
- Synthesized Norethisterone: This achievement by Luis E. Miramontes allowed the development of the first three Combined oral contraceptive pill, better known as the "morning after pill". He is sometimes referred to as "the Father of the Pill".

=== Transport ===
- Dynamic braking:invented by Victor Leaton Ochoa in 1908.
- Jetpack:Invented by pilot & inventor Juan Manuel Lozano Gallegos.

=== Aviation ===
- Hélice Anáhuac (Propeller Anáhuac): invented by engineer Juan Guillermo Villasana López in 1915.
- Villasana Series H (TNCA H)

=== Firearms ===
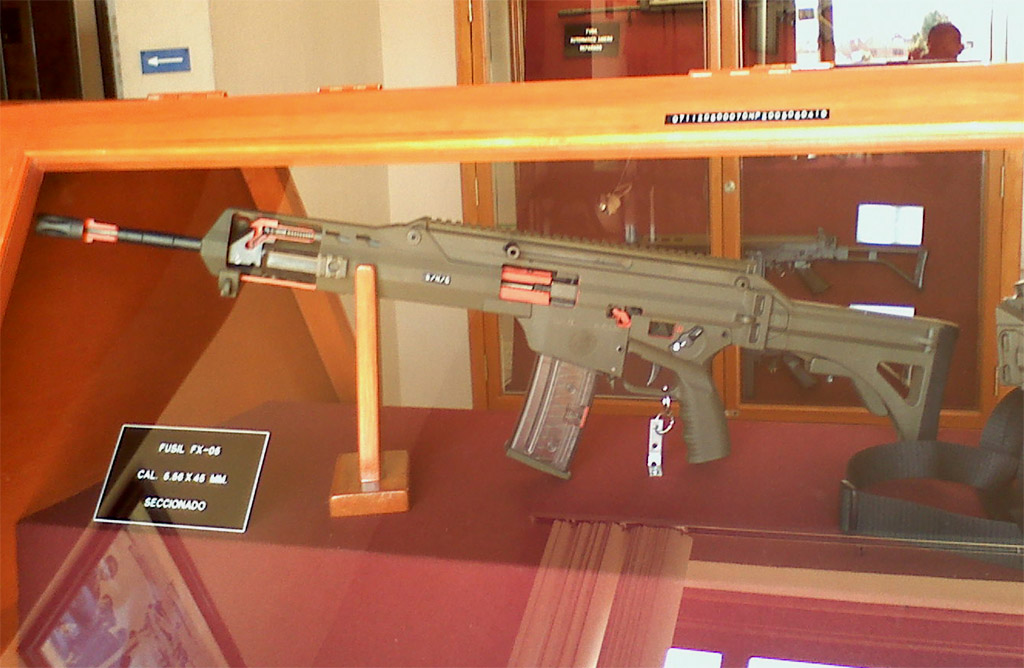
The influence of the G36 receiver, AK styled gas piston and Mexican recoil delaying system can all be seen in this partial cut away of a first generation FX-05 Xiuhcoatl.

- Zaragoza Corla
- Trejo pistol
- Obregón pistol
- Mendoza RM2, created by Rafael Mendoza Blanco
- Mendoza HM-3
- Mendoza C-1934
- FX-05 Xiuhcoatl rifle
- M1908 rifle: The world's first gas-operated semi-automatic rifle. It was used for a short time by the Germans in World War I. Invented by Manuel Mondragon.
- Saint-Chamond-Mondragón.
- Mexican Mauser Model 1954
- Mexican Mauser Model 1936

=== Military technology ===
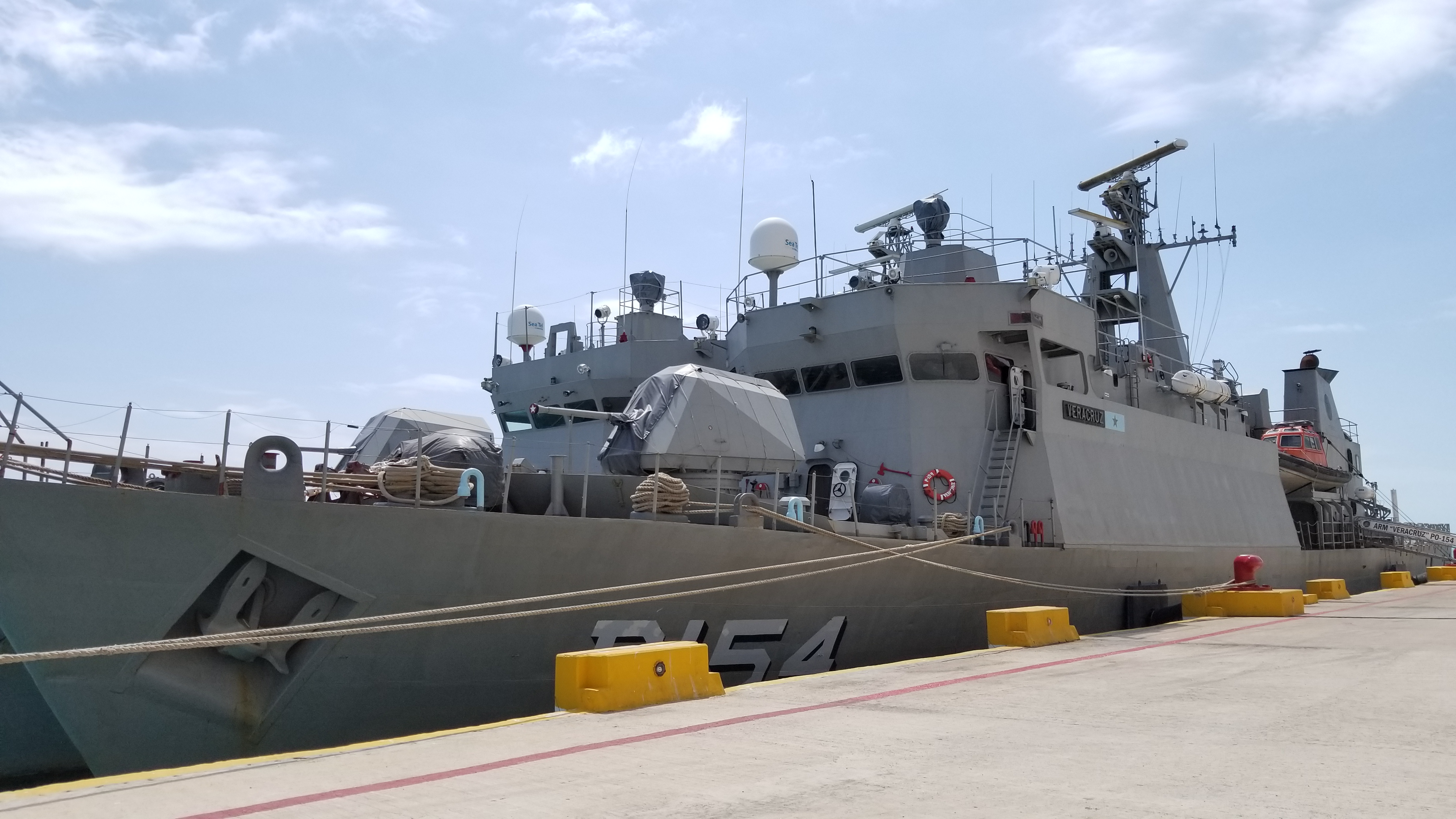
Veracruz (fore) and Guanajuato (rear) at Progreso, Yucatán, Mexico

- DN-V Bufalo
- Sierra class corvette
- Durango class
- Oaxaca class
- Hydra Technologies Ehécatl
- Hydra Technologies Gavilán
- Oaxaca PE-210A Pegasus

=== Music and musical instruments ===
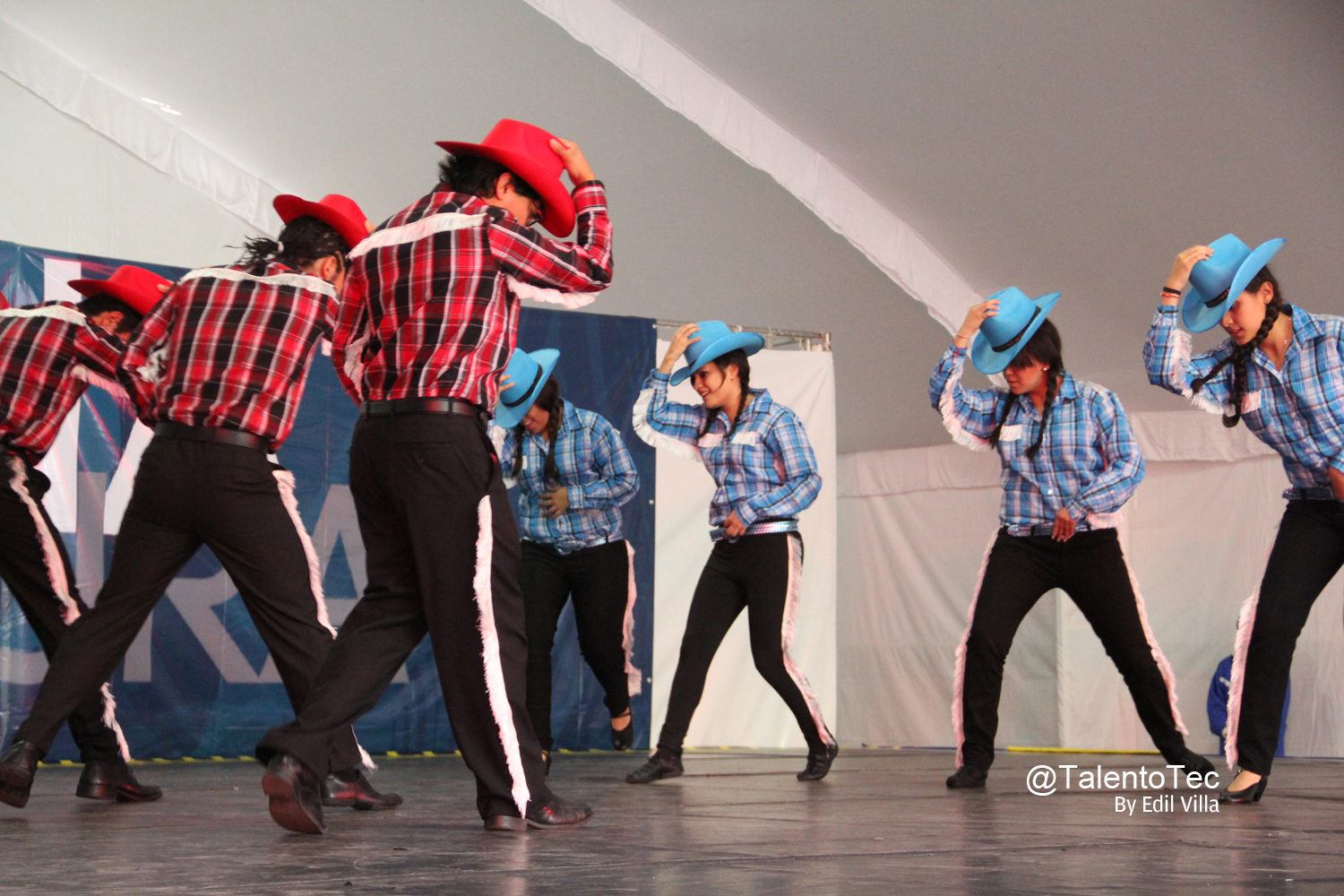
Students at the Monterrey Institute of Technology and Higher Education, Mexico City dancing in the quebradita style

- Quebradita
- Sonido 13: Developed around 1900 by Julián Carrillo, his theories have been used to analyse conscience altering techniques by investigator Robert Alan Monroe, and even using sound as health treatment.
- Son mexicano
- Banda music
- Guitarrón mexicano
- Guitarra panzona
- Tribal guarachero

=== Fashion ===
- Mexican pointy boots

=== Art ===
- Alebrije:invented in the 1930s by cartonero Pedro Linares.

=== Food ===
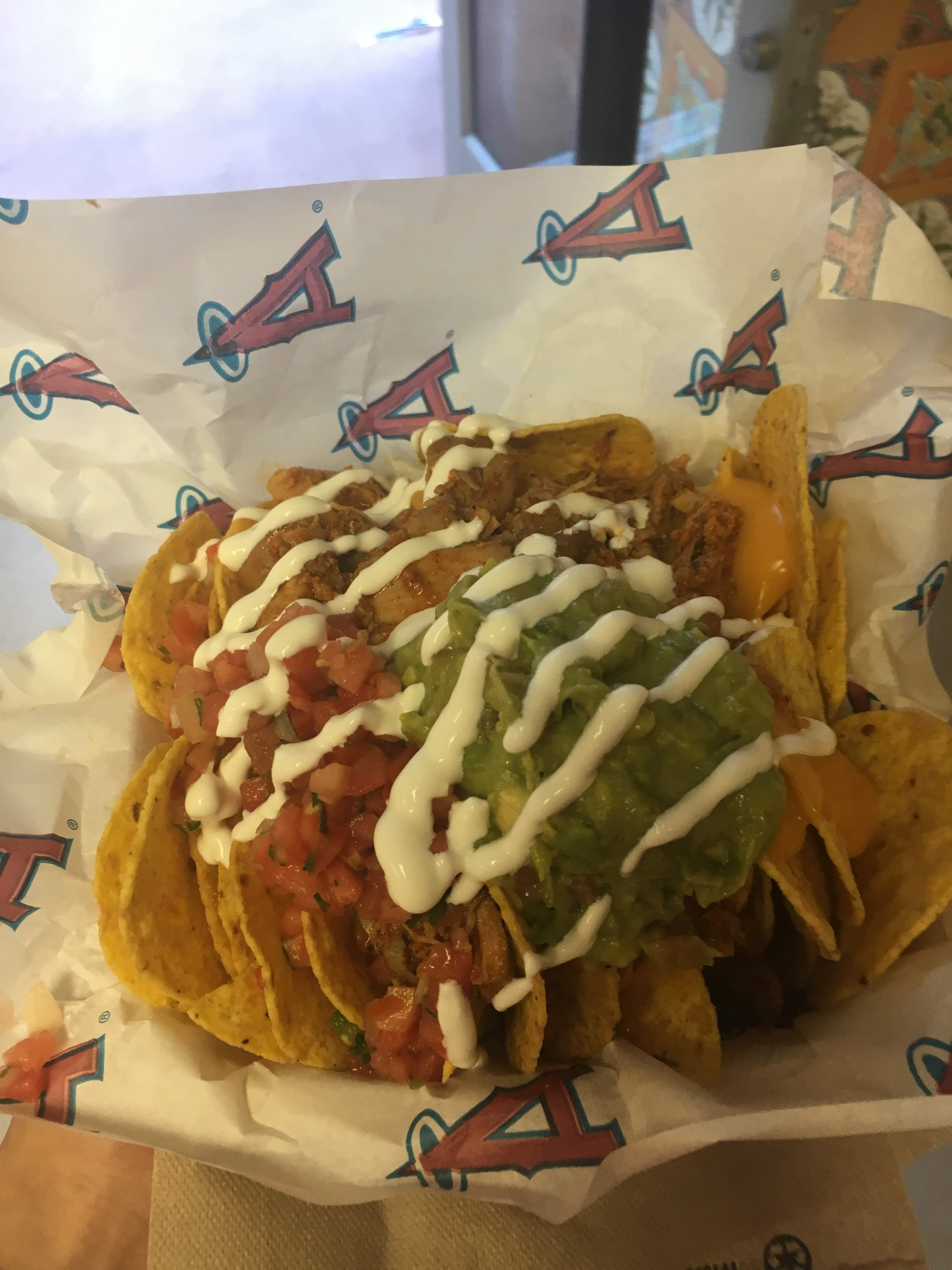
Nachos with cheese, chicken, pico de gallo, sour cream, and guacamole

- Flamin' Hot popcorn:invented by then janitor Richard Montañez.
- Fritos: Invented in 1932 by Gustavo Holguín, he sold the recipe for fritos to the company Highland park confectionery for $100.
- Fajita
- Snow cone
- Japanese peanuts: by Japanese immigrant Yoshigei Nakatani in 1945
- Nachos: By Ignacio Anaya. Nacho is short for Ignacio.
- Caesar salad
- Quesabirria
- Refried beans
- Huarache (food)
- Jarritos

=== Games and celebration ===
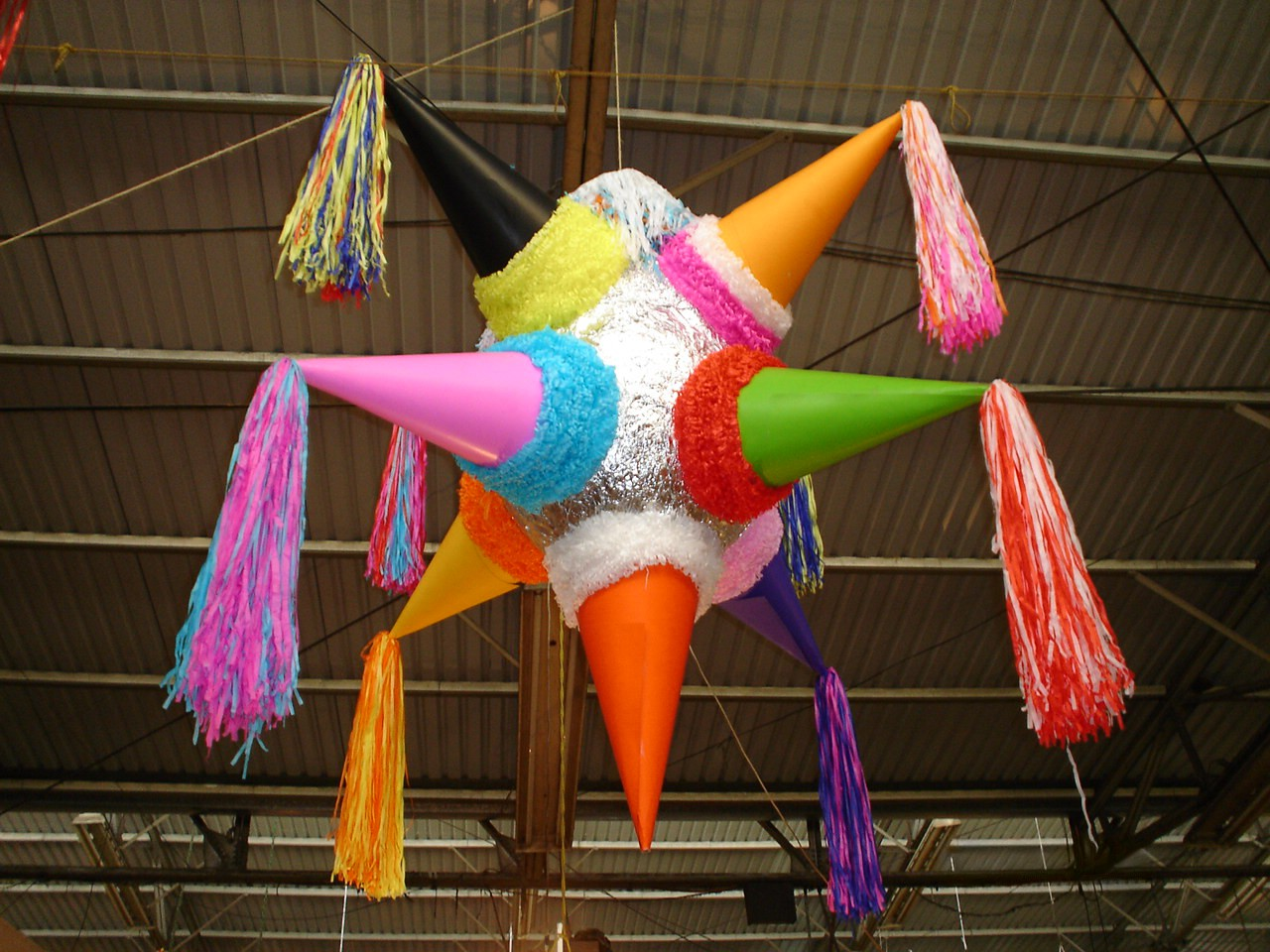
A nine-pointed star piñata

- Maratón board game:invented by Sergio Etchart Sabbath in 1985.
- piñata
- Three-card Monte

=== Dog breeds ===
- Chamuco (a Mexican word which means "devil") or Mexican Pitbull: The breed was developed in central Mexico in the 1970s.
- Calupoh

=== Alcoholic beverages ===
- Margarita
- Kahlúa
- Michelada
- Sotol
- Tequila
- Mezcal

=== Modern technologies ===
- Google (architecture): heavily influenced by the work and research of professor Hector Garcia Molina
- InstaBook: developed in 1997 by Victor Celorio.
- Early color television: Guillermo González Camarena made one of the earliest successful color television transmission systems in 1934. Although not the one used today, NASA used it in 1979 for a series of projects including Voyager 1.
- AcceleGlove: invented by José Hernández-Rebollar. It is an electronic glove that translates hand movements from the American Sign Language into spoken and written words.
- GNOME: developed by Miguel de Icaza and Federico Mena.
- X-ray microscope: developed by Paul Kirkpatrick and Albert Baez.
- Mochila de seguridad (security backpack): developed by primary school student Juan David Hernandez Rojas in response to the growing violence in his home town of Matamoros, Tamaulipas, his invention consists of a backpack lined up with bullet proofed material, security lights, an alarm, and a GPS tracking device that can be connected to the wearers' families phones.
- Solid-state melanin battery: developed by scientist Arturo Solis Herrera, it consists of a solar battery that does not need to be recharged or reloaded.
- Optical ranked-order filtering using threshold decomposition: developed by Dr. Ellen Ochoa.
- Electronuclear reactor: developed by Luis Walter Alvarez.
- 3D Robotics: Founded in 2009 by Chris Anderson and Jordi Muñoz.

=== Communications ===
- Morelos Satellite System
- SkyAlert: A mobile app that notifies users of possible seismic activity.
- Beelinguapp: An app that teaches languages through story telling.
- Tevi: An app that works as an electronic wallet.

=== Sports ===
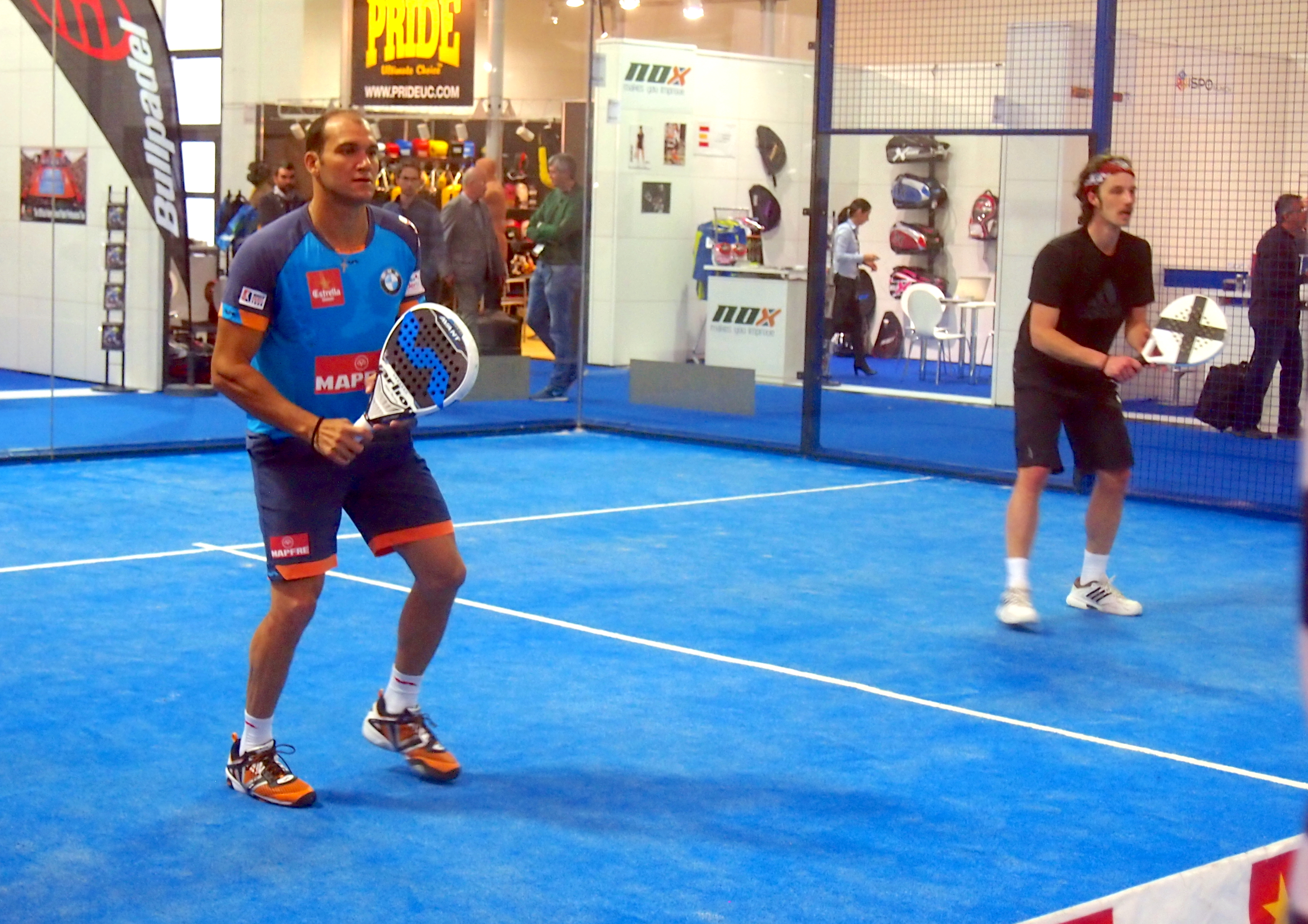
Padel area at ISPO 2014

- Padel
- Metallic silhouette shooting
- Frontenis
- Ulama

=== Political ===
- Recurso de amparo (Writ of protection) idea, which was fundamental in the creation of the Universal Declaration of Human Rights
- Election ink: Developed by Filiberto Vázquez Dávila.

=== Industrial ===
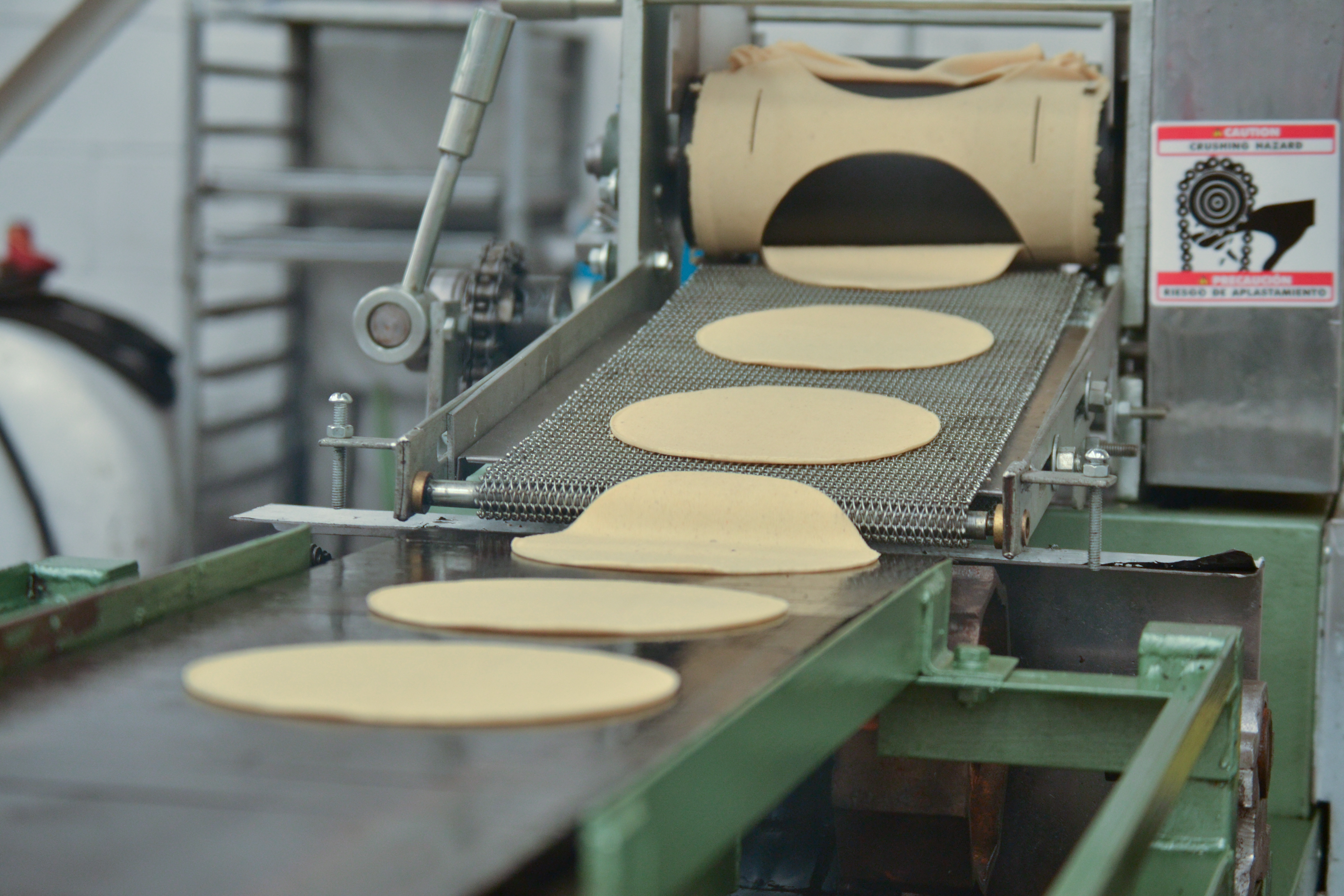
Tortilla machine

- Tortilla machine Created by Everardo Rodríguez Arce and Luis Romero in 1904 and produced 16,000 tortillas a day In 1947.

=== Medical ===
- Assisted ventilation or Mechanical ventilation device (Gätsi ventilator) developed by Dydetec in 2020 to cope in the COVID-19 pandemic
- EVA bra: Developed in 2017 by student Julian Rios Cantu at Monterrey Institute of Technology and Higher Education.
- Probionics S.A. de C.V: founded in 2008 by Luis Armando Bravo Castillo, his company produces prosthetic limbs at %90 less cost than other companies.
- VITACOR UVAD artificial heart: Developed by Dr. Emilio Sacristan Rock.
- Method for predicting fetal membrane rupture based on pro-matrix metalloproteinase-9 (pro-mmp-9): Developed by Biochemist Felipe Vadillo-Ortega.
- Diagnostic methods to detect invasive amoebiasis: Developed by Dr.María del Socorro Flores González.
- Catalytic nanomedicine: A new field in antitumor treatment using supported platinum nanoparticles:Developed by solid-state chemist Tessy María López Goerne.
- Typhus vaccine: Developed by Dr. Maximiliano Ruiz Castañeda in 1940.

== Discoveries ==
- Alcubierre drive a theory in which a spacecraft could achieve possible faster-than-light travel Proposed by Mexican theoretical physicist Miguel Alcubierre.
- Mexianthus: One of many plant species discovered and classified by botanist Ynes Mexia.
- Intensity of cosmic rays related to latitude and Earth's magnetic field:Discovered by Dr.Manuel Sandoval Vallarta and physicist Georges Lemaître.
- Herbig–Haro objects, discovered by Mexican Guillermo Haro and American George Herbig
- Ozone depletion: Mario J. Molina together with F. Sherwood Rowland discovered the CFCs role in the Ozone hole. They were awarded the Nobel Prize in Chemistry.
- Vanadium: discovered in 1801 by Andres Manuel del Rio
- Birth control pill Developed by Luis E. Miramontes in Tepic, Mexico in 1951.
- Labocania, Huehuecanauhtlus, Acantholipan.
