= Alejandro Alagón Cano =

Mexican medical doctor, researcher and academic

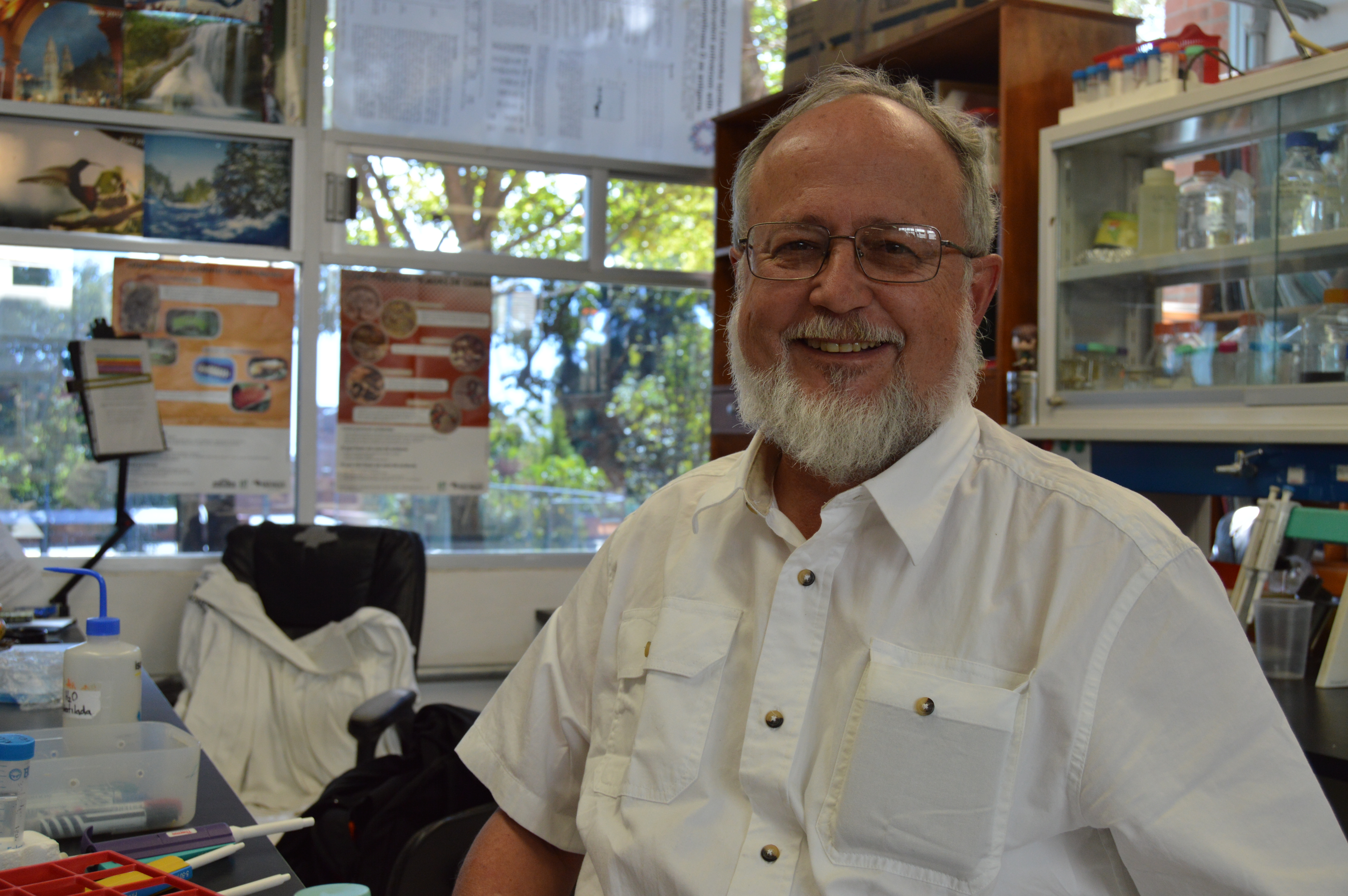
- Alejandro in his office, photo captured (2016)
- Education: National Autonomous University of Mexico
- Occupation: Physician
- Employer: National Autonomous University of Mexico
- Awards: National Prize for Arts and Sciences Mexico (2005)

Alejandro Alagón Cano is a Mexican doctor, researcher, professor and academic. He was an active researcher during the development process of the scorpion antivenom Alacramyn and the pit viper antivenom Antivipmyn, both manufactured by Instituto Bioclon in Mexico. These products were later approved for commercial distribution by the United States Food and Drug Administration (FDA) in 2011 and 2015 and are marketed under the names Anascorp and Anavip, respectively.

== Education ==
Alagón completed his undergraduate degree at the Faculty of Medicine of the National Autonomous University of Mexico (UNAM), later he completed a master's degree and a doctorate in biomedical research, at the same institution. He did postdoctoral studies at Rockefeller University in New York.

== Career ==
He has been instrumental in the development of antivenoms used throughout the Americas and Africa. In the USA he is known for his work on Anascorp, the first scorpion antivenom approved since the establishment of the modern FDA. He is currently a Professor Emeritus at the Institute of Biotechnology-UNAM.

== Awards and distinctions ==
- National University Award (PUN) in the area of Innovation and Technology granted by the National Autonomous University of Mexico in 2004.
- National Prize for Arts and Sciences (Mexico) award granted by the Secretariat of Public Education (Mexico) in 2005.
- Premio Luis Elizondo award granted by the Monterrey Institute of Technology and Higher Education in 2013
