= Beelinguapp =

Language-learning mobile application

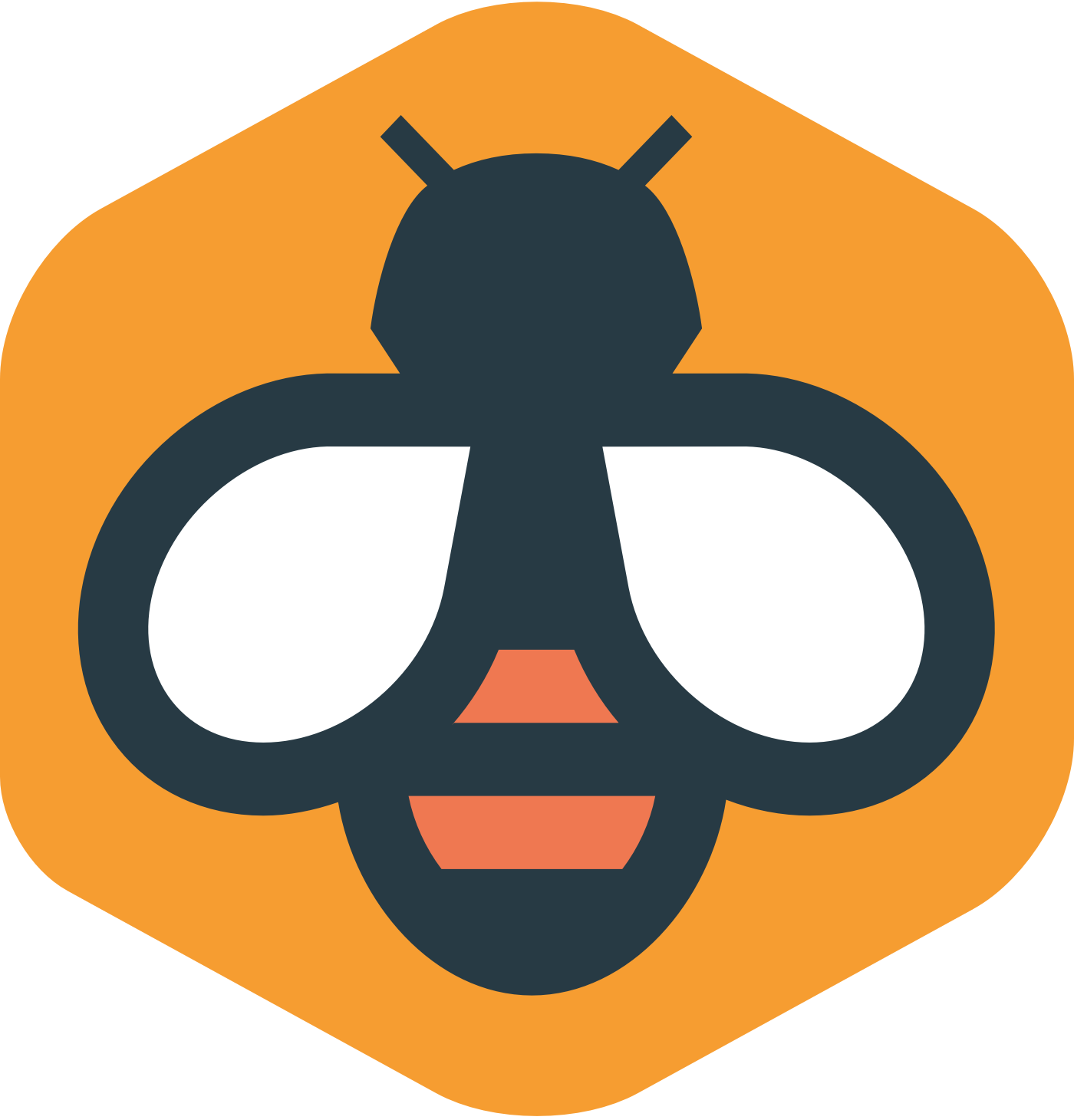
- Website type: Language Learning
- Available in: Multilingual: English; French; Spanish; German; Portuguese; Russian; Turkish; Arabic; Japanese; Korean; Italian; Chinese (Mandarin); Hindi
- Creator: David Montiel
- Website: www.beelinguapp.com
- Launched: 1 September 2017; 9 years ago

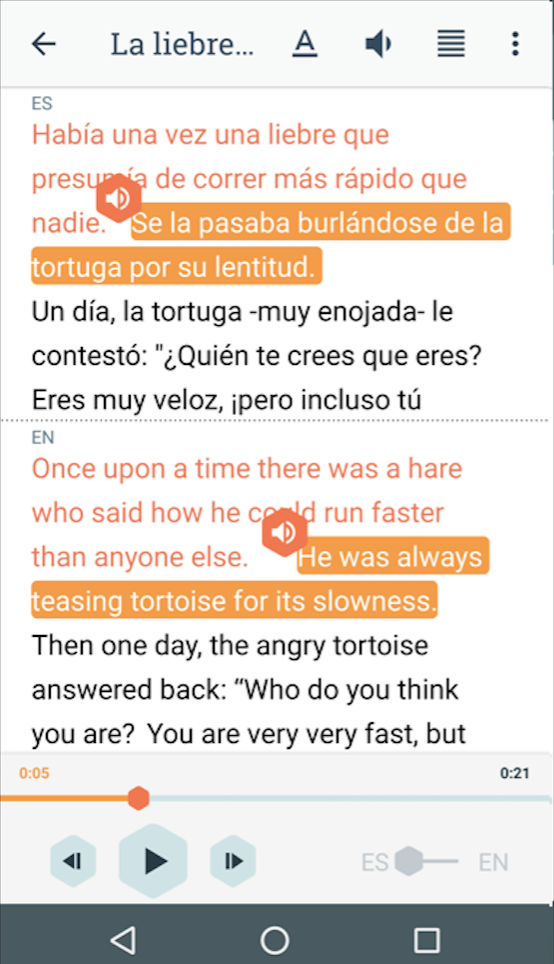
A screenshot of Beelinguapp showing English and Spanish simultaneously

Beelinguapp is a language-learning mobile application. It works by showing a text to the user in two languages simultaneously, allowing the users to use their native language as a references. It also works as an audio book, where users can listen to a recording of a voice reading a text while at the same time a karaoke style animation moves through the text in both languages. The app offers different kinds of texts across 12 languages; with additional languages in development. Beelinguapp app is available on Android and iOS.

== History ==
Beelinguapp's creator, David Montiel, born in Mexico and located in Berlin, Germany, had been having difficulties reading texts and listening to audio books in German. When confronted by a word he still did not know, he realized it was too much of a problem to look for it in the dictionary and figure out which of the definitions suited better in the text. This is how the idea of a text in two languages simultaneously was born. One year after its conception, in September 2016, Beelinguapp went live.

== Learning method ==
Beelinguapp works under two concepts it calls "Side by Side Reading" and "Karaoke Reading". The "Side by Side Reading" shows the user a text in a split screen in two languages side by side, the idea being that the user reads a text in the language being practiced but can always use their native language as a reference. "Karaoke Reading" means that the audio will be playing while the user is reading and a karaoke-style animation will be shown in both the learning and reference languages.

== Initial financing and early recognition ==
In December 2016, Beelinguapp opened a Kickstarter campaign to receive financing for the development of the iOS version of the app and the translation of more stories. By January 2017 the campaign was successful and the development of the iOS version started. In February, 2017 it was featured in the Huffington Post as one of the best 10 Kickstarter project of 2016. Beelinguapp has been featured in Google Play's "Editor's Choice" section, where they recommended 5 language learning apps in the market from around the world and has been named in news articles and blog posts among the best tools to learn Spanish and German. In May, 2017, Beelinguapp was certified by Mike Sharples and the Educational App Store and added to the Educational App Store Catalog. On June 6, 2017, The Mexican newspaper El Universal wrote a featured article about Beelinguapp in both the online site and its printed version. In June 2017 it was selected by Google Play as an "Editor's Choice" app.
