= InstaBook =

American manufacturer

InstaBook Corporation manufactures book on demand equipment. It was founded in 1997, and is located in Gainesville, Florida.

== Background ==
The company provides book-on-demand equipment to bookstores named InstaBook Maker. The system can download, print and bind a book. The system was invented by Victor Celorio who owns the patents for the design.

== History ==
The model of the InstaBook Maker was presented at the BookExpo in Los Angeles in 1999.

InstaBook installed its first book on demand equipment in Canada in 2001. The first bookstore with an InstaBook in the US was the Bookends store in Ridgewood, New Jersey in 2010.
