= Carimba =

The carimba is a national instrument of the Nahua people of Mexico. It is made from a reed, five feet long and an inch or more thick, a brass wire connected both ends and making the reed bend, with a string attaching the wire to the reed, and a jicaro as resonator, played using another reed to set the wires vibrating.
