= Oaxaca PE-210A Pegasus =

Proposed trainer aircraft

PE-210A
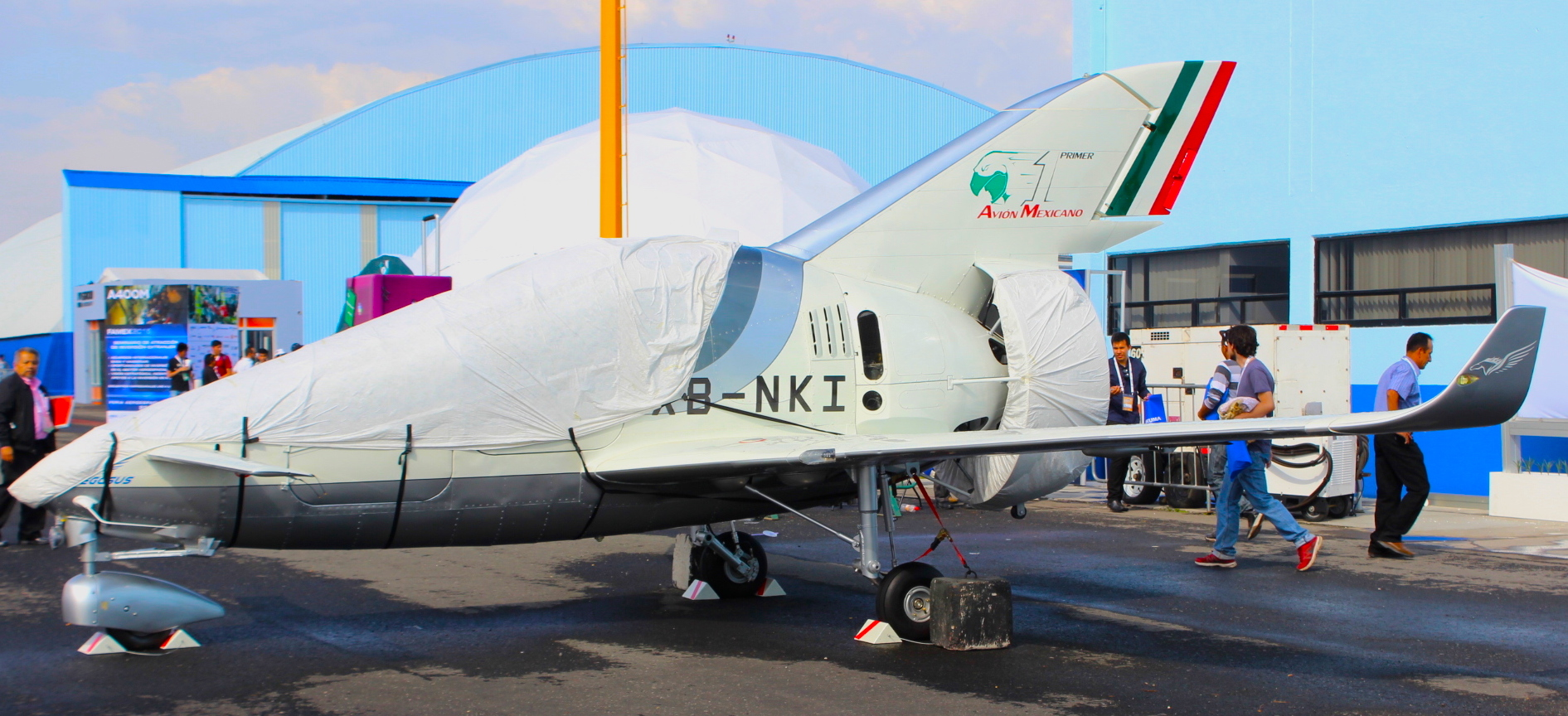

General information
- Type: Trainer/aerobatic
- National origin: Mexico
- Manufacturer: Oaxaca Aerospace
- Status: In development
- Number built: 1

The Pegasus PE-210A is a prototype of a single-engine trainer with canard developed by Oaxaca Aerospace and TechBA.

== Design and development ==
Oaxaca Aerospace began the project in 2011 with the objective of designing an agile, fast and inexpensive two-seat airplane and concluded in mid-2013, the year in which the ground tests began. The aircraft has a rear mounted Lycoming AEIO-390 engine, canards and a tandem design cockpit with dual flight controls. The rear seat is at a higher level with respect to the front seat, which allows a view of 300° vertical and 240° horizontal. The aircraft was first presented to the public at Feria Aeroespacial México (FAMEX) 2015.

== Specifications ==
Data from FAMEX 2015

General characteristics

- Crew: 2
- Length: 24 ft 3 in (7.4 m)
- Wingspan: 29 ft 2 in (8.9 m)
- Wing area: 135 sq ft (12.5 m^{2})
- Empty weight: 2,756 lb (1,250 kg)
- Max takeoff weight: 661 lb (300 kg)
- Fuel capacity: 55.5 US Gallons (210 litres)
- Powerplant: 1 × Lycoming AEIO-390 , 210 hp (160 kW)

Performance

- Maximum speed: 220 kn (250 mph, 410 km/h)
- Cruise speed: 160 kn (190 mph, 300 km/h)
- Stall speed: 64 kn (73 mph, 118 km/h)
- Range: 860 nmi (990 mi, 1,600 km)
- Service ceiling: 17,700 ft (5,400 m)
