= Coralmyn =

Antivenom

Coralmyn, also called Polyvalent Anti-coral Fabotherapic, is a polyclonal antivenom F(ab')^{2} used to treat venomous bites in mammals from the eastern coral snake and the Texas coral snake. It was manufactured in Mexico by the Instituto Bioclon, and was only obtainable in the United States with an application of an USDA importer's permit and state license. Because of the relative rarity of such bites, the remaining United States reserve of this medicine had been restricted to human-only use and expired in 2017. Treatment of small animals (dogs and cats) with this product following accidental bites had proven highly effective in preventing shock and death.
