= Víctor Celorio =

Mexican writer and businessman (born 1957)

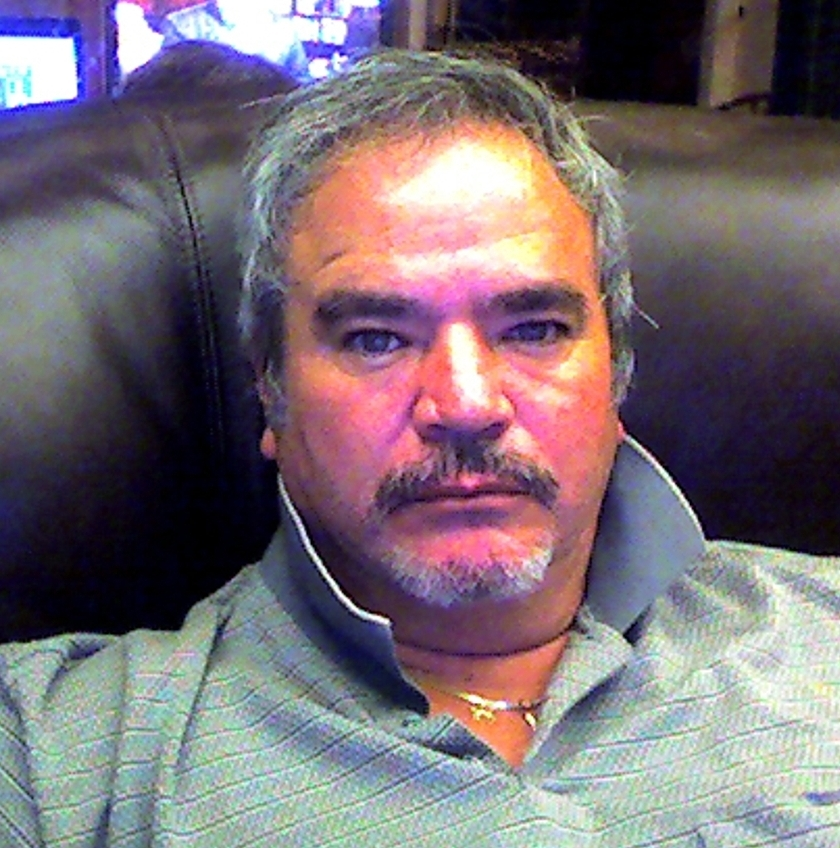
- Inventor Victor Celorio at his home in Gainesville, Orlando, 2009
- Born: Victor Manuel Celorio Garrido; July 27, 1957 (age 69); Mexico City, Mexico
- Occupations: Writer, inventor
- Known for: InstaBook
- Website: www.victorcelorio.com

Víctor Manuel Celorio Celorio (born July 27, 1957, in Mexico City) is a Mexican-American author, entrepreneur, inventor, and former union organizer. He is best known as the inventor of InstaBook, a digital printing technology. He resides and works in Gainesville, Florida.

== Inventions ==
=== InstaBook ===
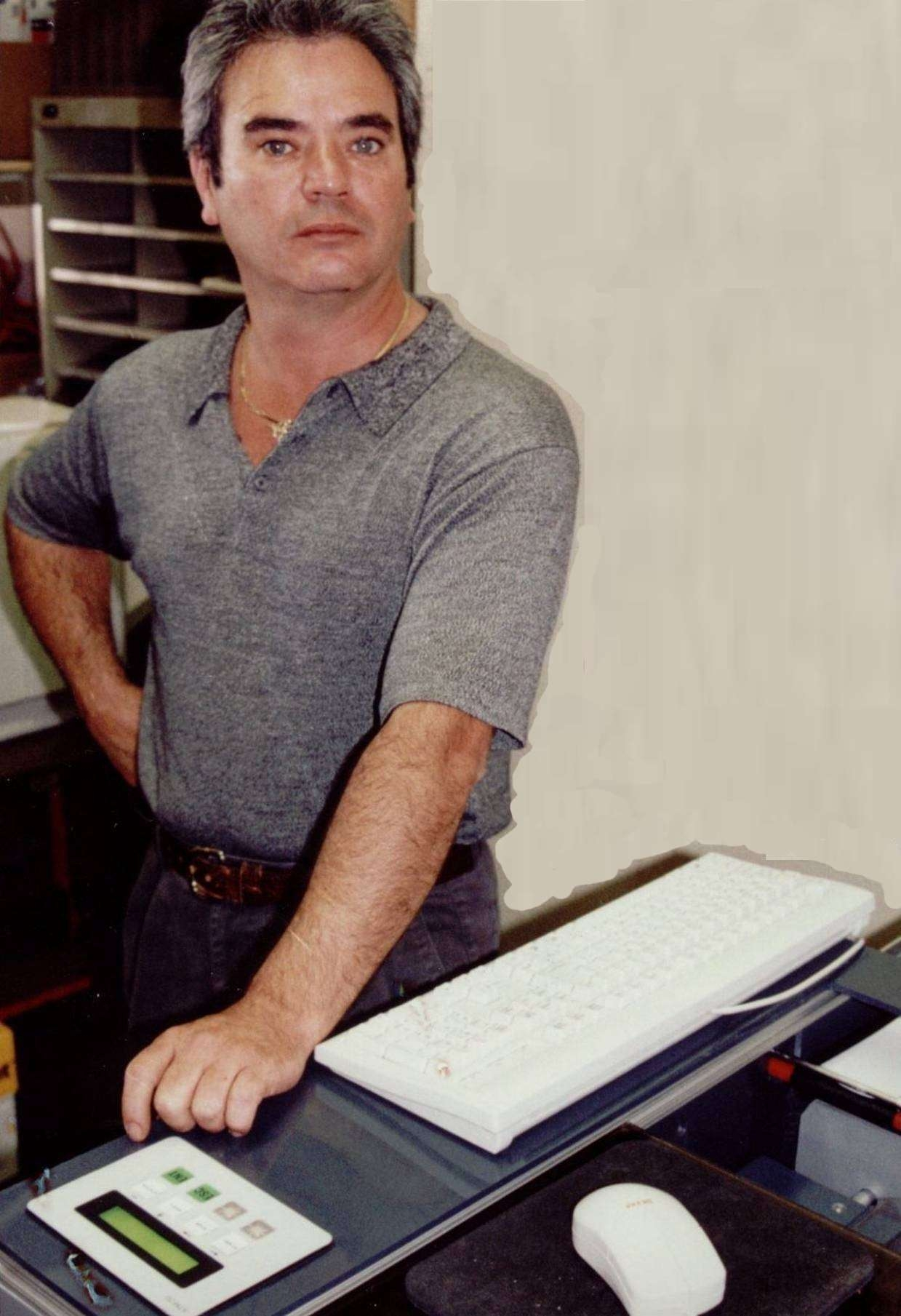
Inventor Victor Celorio operating one of his InstaBook, book-making machines.

As an inventor, Celorio obtained patents for the technology popularly known as InstaBook or Book On Demand, as well as that of distributed printing technology in which a digital file is distributed among as many printing centers as required for immediate production and delivery.

In the late eighties, Celorio created a digital network of print on demand centers around Mexico City, and in the nineties he founded InstaBook Corporation, a company to market the technology that became known as Print on Demand or Book on Demand.

=== Kinetic Lung ===
In 2019, he received a patent for a technology that uses kinetic energy to process massive amounts of urban air, to locate and separate the toxic particles known as PM2.5 and PM10, which are poison for every living being.

In 2018, he founded the nonprofit organization Pulmón Urbano AC (Urban Lung Inc. in the U.S.) to deploy his technology in cities with contaminated urban air. After an initial test in 2017 in the city of León, in México, in June 2019 his foundation installed in Mexicali, Baja California, -the worst contaminated city in Mexico- the first network of Urban Lungs in the world. That network is composed of 300 Residential Lungs -hosted by volunteers at their homes-, and 10 Solar Lungs, hosted by 10 of the most prestigious universities and colleges of the city. Since June his organization self proclaimed this Urban Lung Network has been cleaning 3 million cubic meters of air each day, for a total of hundreds of millions of cubic meters of contaminated air to date and an effective reduction of a 35% in the amount of toxic particles PM2.5 and PM10 floating in the air of Mexicali at the end of October 2019, as was reported in a study presented to the California Air Resources Board by the head of the local nonprofit EconCiencia y Salud AC. The nonprofit Pulmon Urbano AC relied on independent and internationally well-known companies such as PurpleAir and VisualAir to show, in real time, the daily reduction of polluted air in Mexicali achieved by the Urban Lung Network.

== Bibliography ==
Celorio is also a writer and publisher of several books. In an interview published in The Seybold Report, written by George A. Alexander (2002), Victor Celorio described his love affair with books since he was a child. He knew he wanted to be a writer from the time he was 10 years old, and he published his first short story at age 14 in a magazine called Al Sur del Sur.

As an author, Celorio has published six books, both in Spanish and in English. His titles include one of the first books ever distributed through the Internet. The book was entitled Proyecto Mexico (Blue Unicorn Editions, Florida, 1995, ISBN 1-58396-059-7). This work is a political essay published in 1995 in which the author proposes that Mexico, his country of origin, lacks a long-term project. Therefore, all political remedies to the problems affecting that country will lack a global goal and will be short-term. Thus, Mexico as a country will go from one short-term solution to the next until a true national project is negotiated among all political parties.

Publication year	Title	ISBN	Genre
1999	Twisted Gods	ISBN 1-891355-91-0	fiction thriller
1997	Blood Relatives	ISBN 1-891355-66-X	fiction
1995	Proyecto Mexico	ISBN 1-58396-059-7	political essay
1990	The Blue Unicorn	ISBN 1-58396-064-3	novel, fiction
1985	El Unicornio Azul	ISBN 1-58396-063-5	novel, fiction
1981	Espejo de Obsidiana	ISBN 1-891355-09-0	short-story collection
