= Mike Sharples =

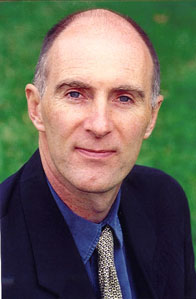
- Born: 14 December 1952 (age 73); Sale, England
- Education: St. Andrews University; University of Edinburgh, Dept. of Artificial Intelligence
- Occupation: Technologist
- Known for: human-centred design, evaluation of technologies of learning, application of studies of human cognition and social interaction to the design of novel interactive systems
- Sharples' voice recorded January 2015
- Website: www.mikesharples.org

Michael Sharples (born 14 December 1952 in Sale, England) is a British academic working in educational technology. He is an Emeritus Professor of Educational Technology at The Open University.

== Background ==
Sharples graduated from St. Andrews University in 1976 with a BSc. Hons in Computational Science, then moved to the Dept of Artificial Intelligence at the University of Edinburgh as a post graduate student. His PhD thesis was on the topic of Cognition, Computers and Creative Writing.

== Career ==
Sharples held various academic appointments before becoming director for the Centre for Educational Technology and Distance Learning at the University of Birmingham and later professor of learning sciences and Director of Learning Sciences Research Institute at the University of Nottingham.

== Research ==
Sharples' research focus is on adapting and developing new technology and socio-technical systems to facilitate learning, such as the use of mobile devices.

In 2022 he published the book Story Machines with Rafael Pérez y Pérez. The book is about the history of story-generating machines. A review of the book in Science described it as "a readable, engaging, and instructive introduction to the mechanisms according to which computers have been made to produce “stories".

== Books ==
- Sharples, M. (1985) Cognition, Computers and Creative Writing, Chichester: Ellis Horwood.
- Sharples, M., Hogg, D., Hutchison, C., Torrance, S., Young, D. (1989) Computers and Thought: a Practical Introduction to Artificial Intelligence. MIT Press. 406 pp.
- Sharples, M. (ed.)(1993) Computer Supported Collaborative Writing. Springer-Verlag.
- Sharples, M. & van der Geest, T. (eds.)(1996) The New Writing Environment: Writers at Work in a World of Technology. Springer-Verlag.
- Sharples, M. (1999) How We Write: Writing as Creative Design. London: Routledge.
- Littleton, K., Scanlon, E. & Sharples, M. (eds.)(2012) Orchestrating Inquiry Learning. Routledge. ISBN 0415601134.
