= Instituto Bioclon =

Mexican research institute

Instituto Bioclon S.A. de C.V.
- Type: Private
- Industry: Biomedicine
- Founded: 1990
- Headquarters: Mexico City, Mexico
- Services: Antivenom research and development
- Parent: Silanes Laboratories

The Instituto Bioclon S.A. de C.V. (Bioclon Institute) was formed in 1990 to research and develop F(ab’)2 antivenoms. On May 6, 2015 they received approval from the FDA to commercialize Anavip becoming their second drug approved by the FDA after ANASCORP. Both are commercialized in the US by Rare Disease Therapeutics, Inc. The company is performing clinical trials to get approval for a third drug, ANALATRO, designed to treat black widow spider envenomation.

== Operations ==
The Instituto Bioclon is located in Mexico City, Mexico and has a Certificación Internacional de Buenas Prácticas de Manufactura (International Certificate for Good Manufacturing Practices) which was granted to Bioclon by the Instituto Nacional de Vigilancia de Alimentos y Medicamentos, (INVIMA) (National Food and Drug Monitoring Institute), of the Ministry of Health and Social Protection of Colombia, as well as by COFEPRIS, in Mexico.

== Products ==
- Anavip – timber rattlesnake antivenom
- Coralmyn – coral snake antivenom
- Antivipmyn – pit viper antivenom
- Antivipmyn TRI – Central and South American snakes
- Antivipmyn Africa – African snakes
- Alacramyn – scorpion antivenom
- Reclusmyn – brown recluse antivenom
- Aracmyn – black widow antivenom

The Bioclon Institute is the only Mexican company that has obtained an "orphan drug" status from the Food and Drug Administration (FDA) of the United States for its products.

== See also ==
- Alejandro Alagón Cano
- Lourival Possani Postay
