= Traditional games of Mexico =

Mexico has some traditional games and activities.

== History ==
In the aftermath of the 1910s Mexican Revolution, indigenous sports and physical culture practices were included in some governmental programs meant to bring the various groups of Mexico together. However, such programs mostly faded away, with a minor resurgence of them toward the turn of the 21st century.

== Traditional games ==
=== Arranca cebollitas ===
Arranca cebollitas is a game where participants form a line, with each one standing behind a fellow participant and holding that participant's waist. One opponent attempts to pull the participant at the back of the line away from the rest of the line; if successful, the opponent repeats this until they can remove all players from the line.

=== La víbora de la mar ===
LA VÍBORA DE LA MAR (lit. The sea snake) is a traditional singing game originating in Mexico. Participants hold hands creating the “snake” and they run around the playground. It is a popular children's game in Mexico and Latin America, and also in Spain where it is known as "pasemisín". This game has become a tradition at Mexican weddings. The bride and groom stand up high on chairs and are encircled and held by family members representing the family union and support towards them. Meanwhile, other participants will form the “snake” and dance and bump against them, trying to knock them off the chairs, representing all the obstacles and problems that may try to bring them down. Family and friends try to keep the couple standing on their chairs, symbolizing that they will keep the couple together and support them through adversity.

=== Lotería ===
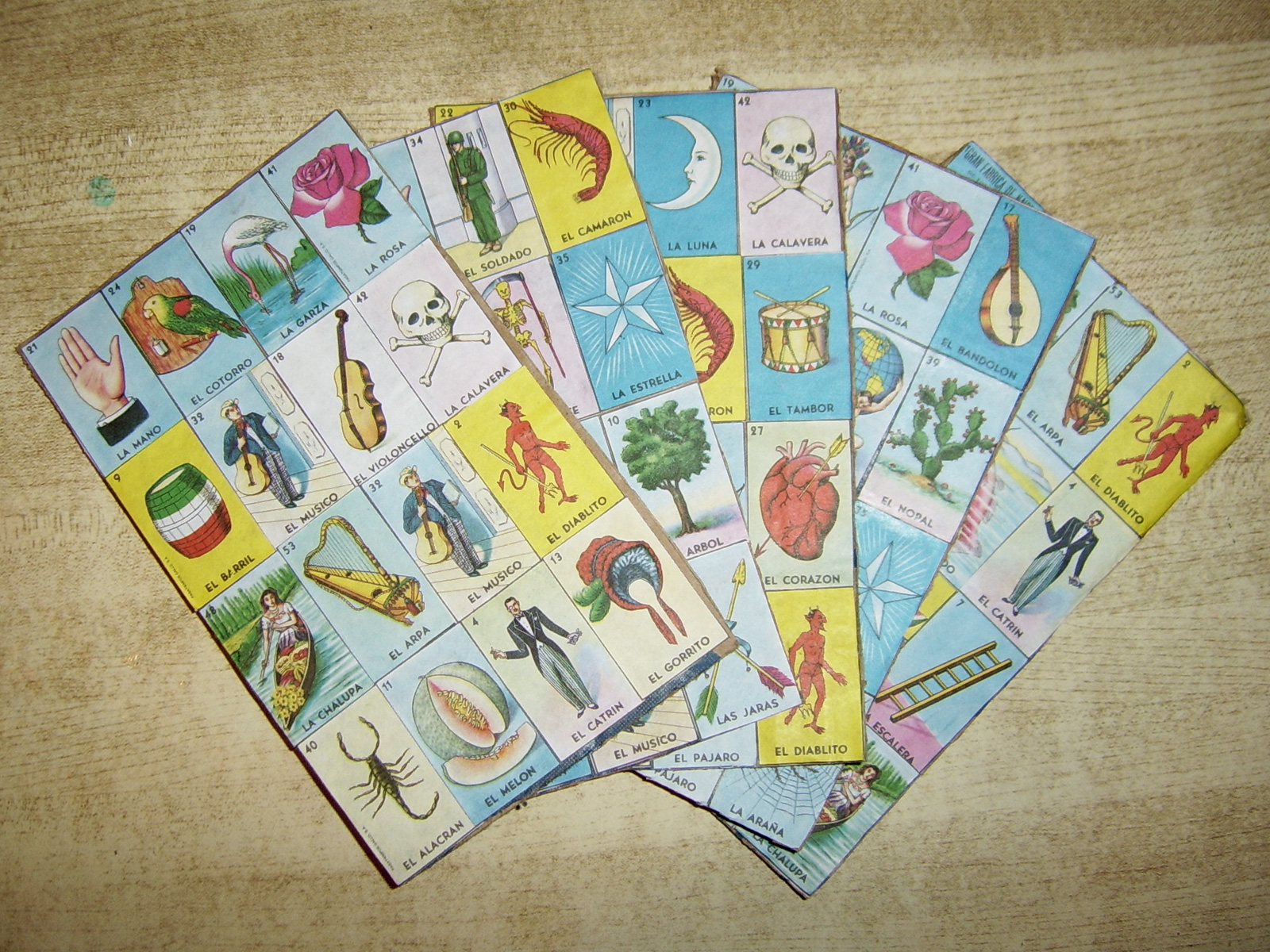
Lotería boards

Lotería (Spanish word meaning "lottery") is a traditional Mexican board game of chance, similar to bingo, but played with a deck of cards instead of numbered balls. Each card has an image of an object, its name, and a number, although the number is usually ignored. Each player has at least one tabla, a board with a randomly created 4 × 4 grid selected from the card images. Players choose a tabla ("board") to play with, from a variety of previously created tablas, each with a different selection of images.

== Ball games ==
=== Mesoamerican ballgame ===
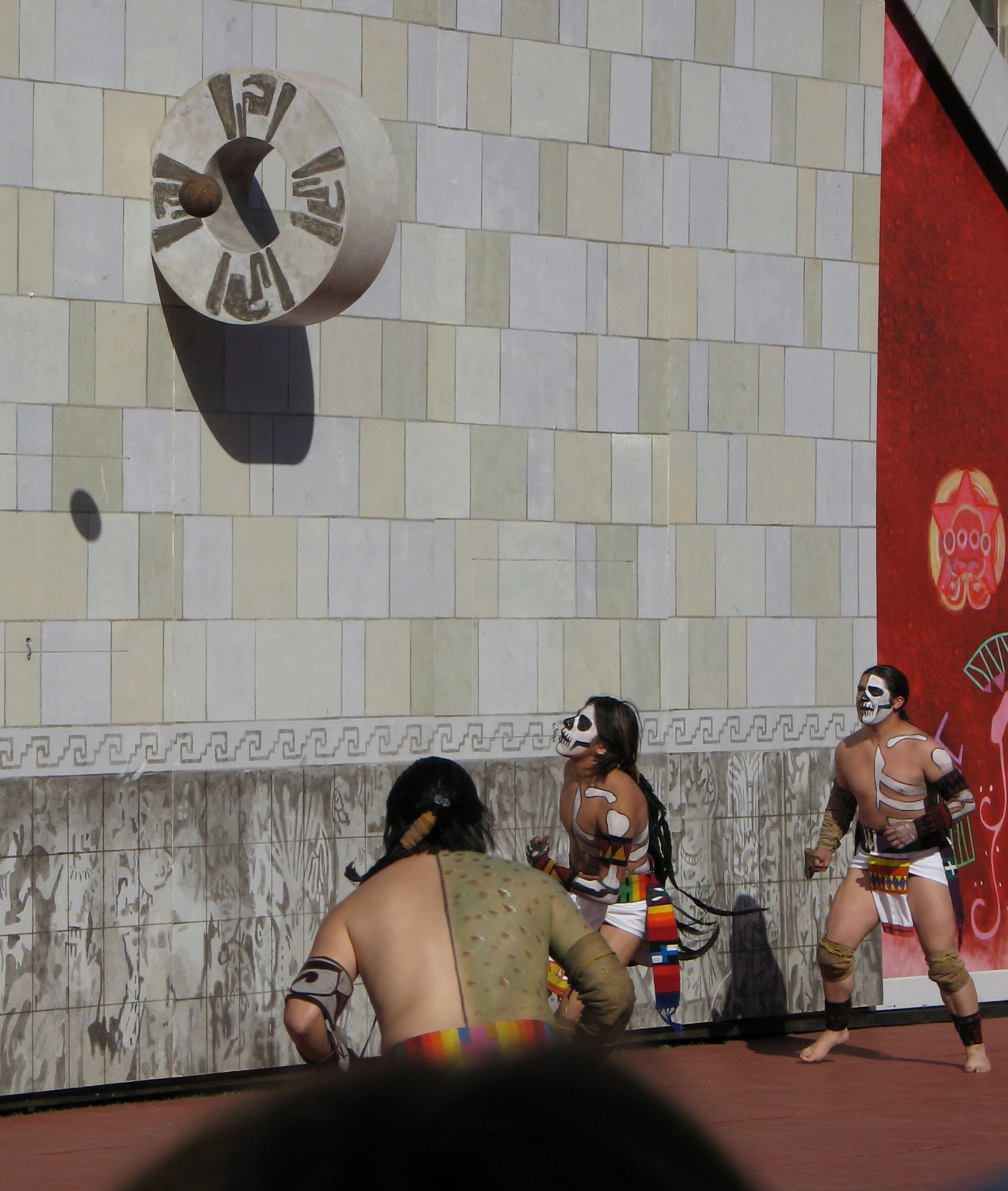
The ball in front of the goal during a game of pok-ta-pok, 2006

The Mesoamerican ballgame (Classical Nahuatl: ōllamalīztli, Nahuatl pronunciation: [oːlːamaˈlist͡ɬi], Epigraphic Mayan: pitz) was a sport with ritual associations played since at least 1650 BCE (the middle Mesoamerican Preclassic period of the pre-Columbian era) by the people of Ancient Mesoamerica. The sport had different versions in different places during the millennia, and a modernized version of the game, ulama, is still played by the indigenous peoples of Mexico in some places.

=== Pelota mixteca ===
Pelota mixteca is a game somewhat like tennis in which participants strike the ball using a hitting surface attached to their gloved hand.

=== Pelota purépecha ===
Pelota purépecha is a hockey-like game played with a ball that is on fire.

=== Timbomba ===
Timbomba or Kimbomba is a game about hitting a short stick as far as possible using a longer stick held in the hand.

== Animal events ==
=== Bullfighting ===
Bullfighting is an activity introduced to Mexico by the Spanish.

=== Charrería ===
Charrería involves participants going through several equestrian events.

== See also ==
- Traditional Mexican handcrafted toys
