= History of sport in Mexico =

Mexico has a history of sport and games which is based in its indigenous and Spanish heritage and more recent American influences.

== Pre-Columbian era ==
=== Mesoamerican ball game ===
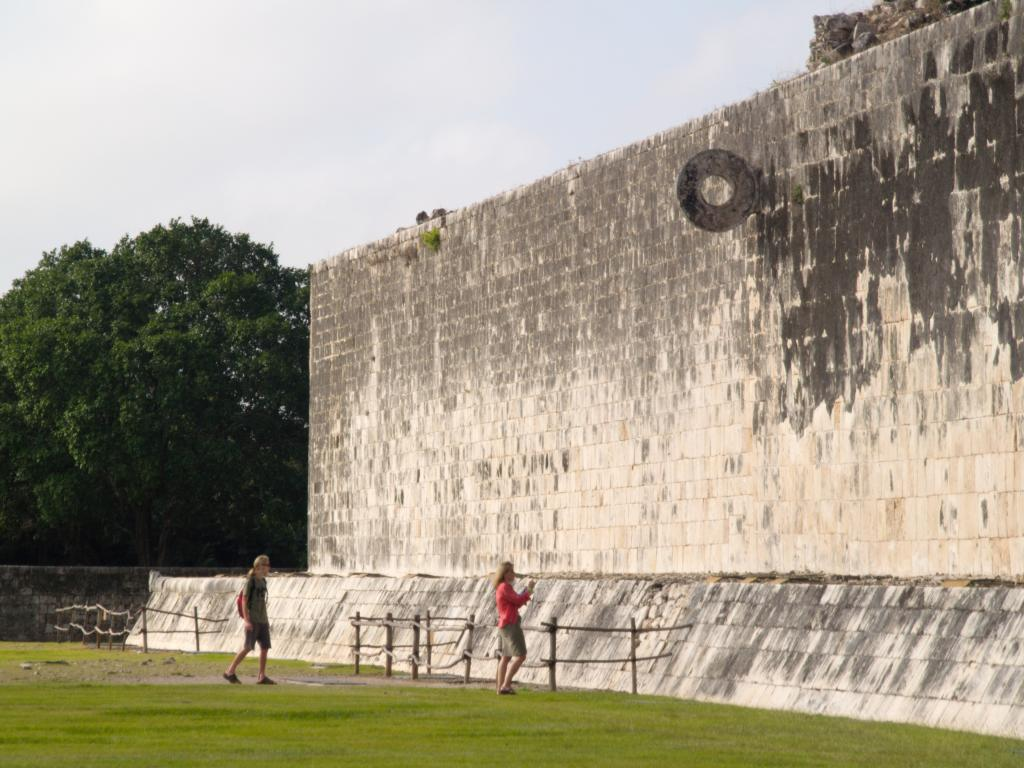
A stone ring located 9 m (30 ft) above the floor of the Great Ballcourt, Chichen Itza

The Pre-Columbian people of Mesoamerica have played the Mesoamerican ball game for over 3,000 years. Archaeologists found the oldest ballcourt yet discovered – dated to approximately 1400 BC – at Paso de la Amada in Mexico. The exact rules of the traditional ballgame remain unknown. Researchers believe that the sport probably resembled racquetball or volleyball, where the object is to keep the ball in play. The winner was sacrificed.

In their Post-Classical Era (1000–1697 CE), the Maya began placing vertical stone rings on each side of the court, with the object of passing the ball through one. Several of these were placed quite high, as at Chichen Itza, where they stand 6 meters from the ground. Players would strike the ball with their hips or forearms, or employed rackets, bats, or hand-stones.

The ball was made of rubber and weighed up to 4 kg or more, with sizes that differed greatly over time or according to the version played. Games took place between two individuals and between two teams of players. The ballgame played out within a large masonry structure which contained a long narrow playing alley flanked by walls with both horizontal and sloping (or, more rarely, vertical) surfaces. The walls were often plastered and brightly painted. A version of the game called Ulama is still played in the Mexican state of Sinaloa. Another ball game Tlachtli, was often played on a court with sloped sides. The game had deep cultural and religious significance, and its popularity persisted among some indigenous communities.

Pelota purépecha has the Purépecha language, and is an Indigenous Mexican sport. A common variant, distinguished as pasárutakua in Purépecha, uses a ball which has been set on fire and can be played at night. It has a league, several practicing communities and about 800 players across Mexico as of 2010. It is one of 150 pre-Hispanic Mexican games at risk of dying out along with Ulama.

== Colonial era ==
By the 18th-century Spanish colonialists had introduced new sports such as horse racing and bullfighting, which quickly gained popularity among the elite and became significant social events. Additionally, activities like fencing and swordplay were adopted from European martial traditions, particularly among the upper classes. Cultural festivals often featured a variety of athletic competitions, blending local customs with colonial practices, and reflecting the rich, hybrid nature of Mexican society during this period.

=== Bullfighting ===
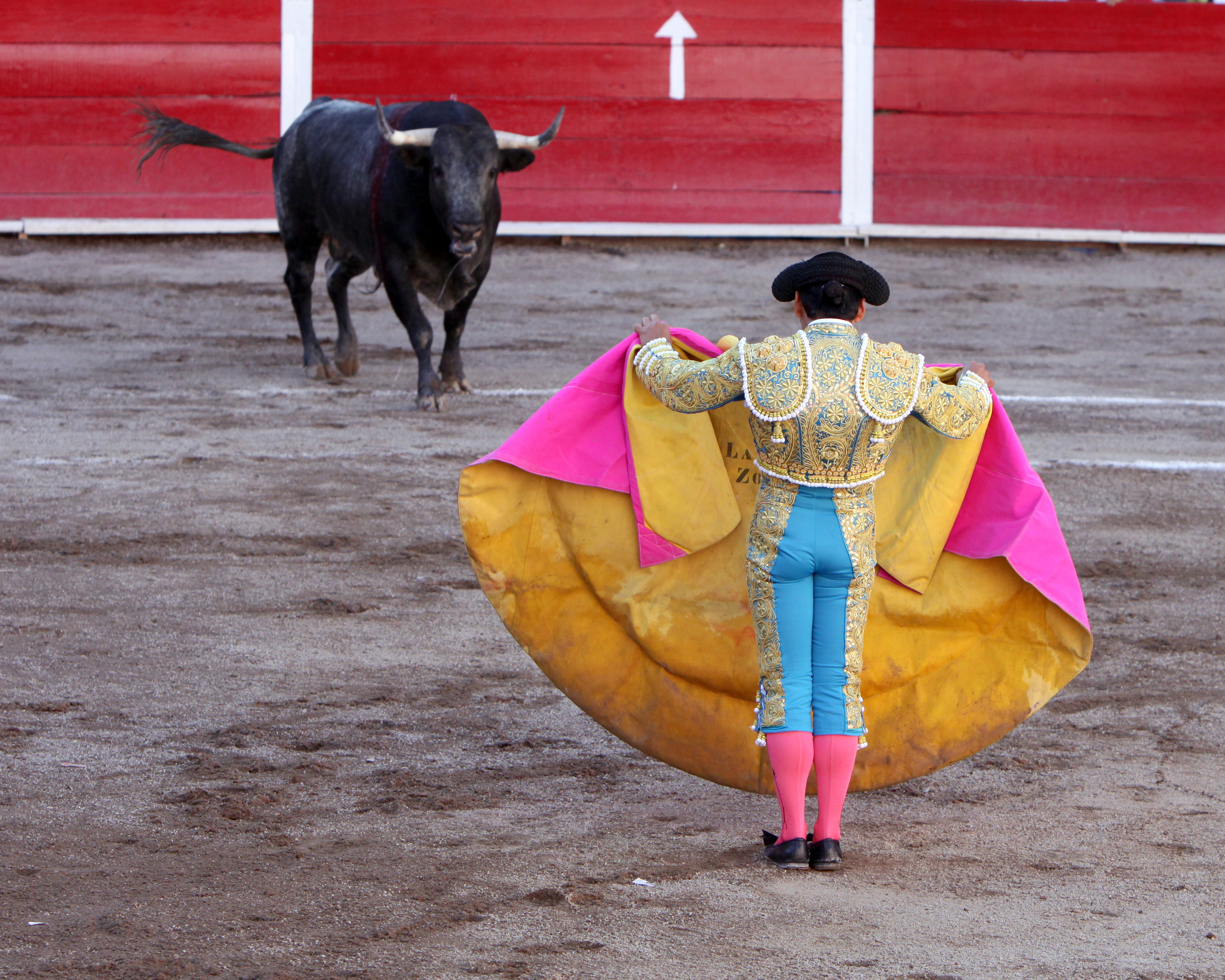
A bullfight at the 2010 Feria Nacional de San Marcos

Typically, a bullfight in Mexico includes a variety of rodeo events known as charreadas, and traditional folkloric dances. Thousands of bullfighting events occur in Mexico. In certain areas of the country, bullfighting generates a large amount of revenue from the local population, as well as visiting tourists.

As evidence of the popularity of the sport, the largest bullring in the world is the Plaza Mexico, located in Mexico City. The Plaza México has been host to many of the world's best and most famous bullfighters. The anniversary of the 1946 opening of Plaza Mexico is celebrated annually with a special bullfight called the "Corrida de Aniversario".

=== Horse racing ===
Horse racing in Mexico boasts a rich tradition and remains a vibrant sport, with the Hipódromo de las Américas in Mexico City being the most prominent venue. The sport enjoys widespread popularity, supported by a dedicated fan base and a thriving betting scene. Despite economic challenges, horse racing in Mexico continues to thrive, with notable horses and jockeys contributing to its legacy and connecting with international racing circuits. Various Mexican jockeys have made a name for themselves both nationally and internationally. Some have competed successfully in major races in the U.S. and other countries, showcasing the talent present in Mexican horse racing. Victor Espinoza a Mexican jockey in American Thoroughbred horse racing won the Triple Crown in 2015 on American Pharoah. The Agua Caliente Racetrack former horse racing track in Tijuana, Baja California, now named the Caliente Hipódromo, Racetrack and the Agua Caliente Casino and Resort, is a resort and casino that includes a greyhound racing. It was the site of several industry firsts, including starting gates, caliente safety helmets, the first track to have a track announcer and "pick six" wagering. Both Phar Lap and Seabiscuit ran and won the Agua Caliente Handicap, which for a time was the richest in North America. The lavish resort and racetrack on the Mexican border was popular among Americans, particularly Hollywood celebrities, because drinking, gambling and horse racing were still illegal in most of the neighboring U.S. states. The first manager of the track was Tommy Gorman, who had previously been involved in ice hockey.

=== Charrería ===
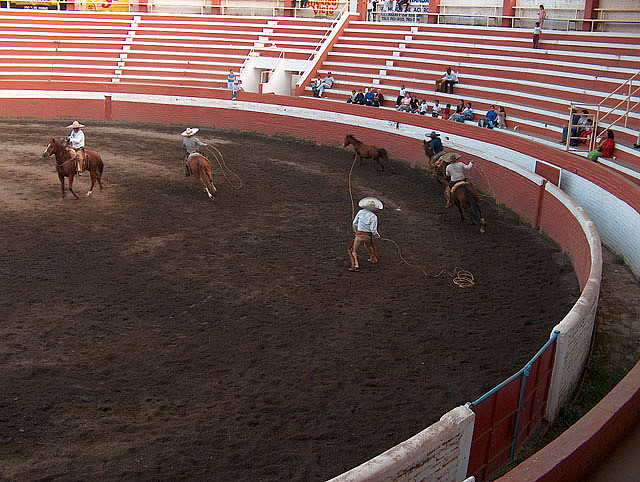
During a charreada, a charro skillfully maneuvers his horse to lasso and capture a running steed, demonstrating precise horsemanship and traditional techniques integral to the sport.

Charrería is the national sport of Mexico, with origins dating back to the 16th century. It encompasses a range of equestrian events developed in Mexico, reflecting the country's rich cultural heritage. The principal event within Charrería is the charreada, a traditional rodeo-style competition that seeks to preserve the customs and techniques of the charro, a term used to denote a traditional Mexican horseman or cowboy, particularly from the state of Jalisco.

The Azteca., recognized as the national horse of Mexico, is integral to Charrería due to its agility and suitability for the sport's various demands. The organization and regulation of Charrería events are overseen by the Federación Mexicana de Charrería (Mexican Federation of Charrería), which plays a key role in maintaining and promoting the traditions associated with this equestrian sport.

charreada is not only a competition but a cultural celebration that embodies the values and traditions of Charrería, with participants wearing traditional attire and the event often accompanied by music, reflecting the deep-rooted heritage and community spirit of Mexico.

=== Cockfight ===
Cockfighting is not banned in Mexico, and practiced in the Mexican states of Michoacán, Aguascalientes, Jalisco, Sinaloa, and Veracruz, mostly during regional fairs and other celebrations. Cockfights are performed in palenques (pits). Cockfighting remains legal in the municipality of Ixmiquilpan and throughout Mexico.

== 19th century ==
In the 19th century, British influences brought sports such as tennis and cricket to Mexico. By the end of the century, the growing American presence introduced baseball, with the sport taking root in Mexico City before growing in prominence throughout the rest of the country. During the Porfiriato, poor people gained access to sport, and the Mexican government sought to control the growth of American and European sporting influences in Mexico, which were seen as potentially aiding in nation-building and constructing positive traits, but containing some barbaric practices.

Cricket faded away by the early 20th century with the growth of baseball and the return of British troops to Europe in relation to World War I.

== 20th century ==
Sport was increasingly embraced by 20th-century Mexicans as a way to raise their international profile, allowing for the nation's involvement in regional integration movements such as Pan-Americanism, and as a way to work on issues of national import. For example, the 1968 Summer Olympics and 1970 FIFA World Cup were used to show on the world stage that Mexico had successfully achieved modernity in the decades after its 1910s revolution.

After the revolution, sport was seen by the government as a way to help bind the various ethnic groups together under the mestizo identity, with cultural practices such as dance transmitted between the groups; however, indigenous practices mostly faded away by the end of the century, with Western sports being the main ones used to unify society. The Mexican police and military also used sport as a way to encourage greater discipline and unity. As part of the general reforms in Mexican society at the time, women were also given more equality in sports.

From the turn of the 20th century onwards, there were more foreigners and American influences present in Mexico, reshaping local culture and sporting practices. Association football, which inclined toward hosting rivalry matches between Spaniards and Mexicans in the early part of the century, grew to become the most popular Mexican sport by the later half of the century.

Mexican Americans helped create new sporting ties between Mexico and the United States, as they became involved in sports such as baseball as part of Americanization efforts of the time; these transnational activities sometimes involved the diaspora playing in the border states, as well as the unique instance of the Tecolotes de los Dos Laredos becoming the only Mexican League baseball team to operate on both sides of the border. Lucha libre, comparable to but diverging from contemporary professional American wrestling, grew from the 1940s onward. Boxing also became an important symbol of Mexicanness after initially being perceived as foreign during the Porfiriato, being imported from the Anglophone world and then feeding into Mexican ambitions for international repute.

Volleyball gained popularity in Mexico in the mid-20th century, with both beach and indoor volleyball becoming widespread. Mexico has produced strong national teams in both disciplines, particularly excelling in women’s volleyball.

== 21st century ==
Mexicans have become more involved in the American Major League Baseball (MLB), with racial hostilities against them having faded away. In 1999, MLB allowed Mexicans to vote for the All-Star players for the first time, giving them 6% of the ballots. The growth of soccer in the United States, aided by Mexican migration, has also seen greater transnational ties in that sport.
