= Temple of the Feathered Serpent, Teotihuacan =

Pre-Columbian pyramid in central Mexico

Pyramid of the Feathered Serpent
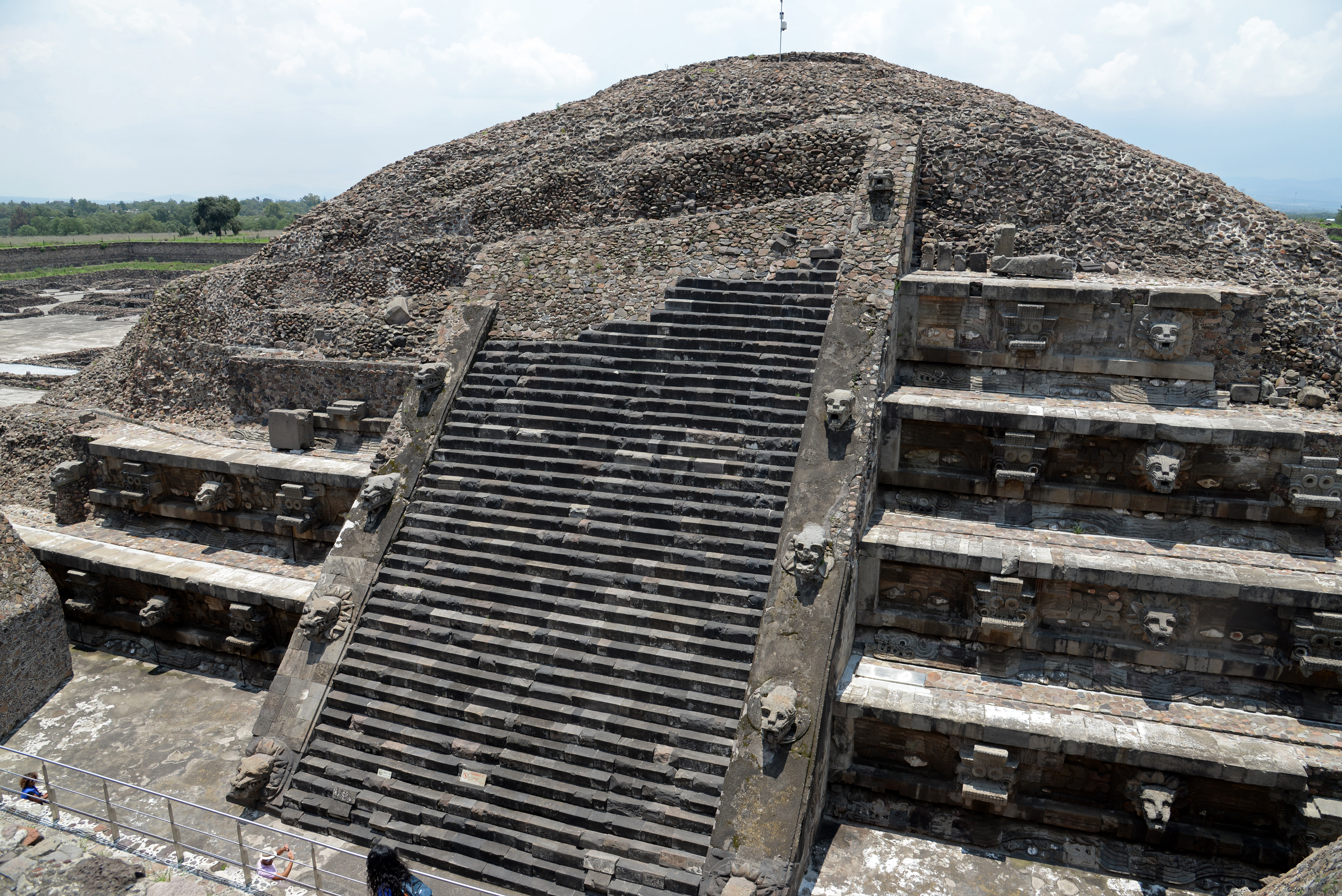
- The Temple of the Feathered Serpent
- Interactive map of Pyramid of the Feathered Serpent
- 19.6818°N 98.8461°W
- Type: Mesoamerican pyramid
- Periods: Classic
- Location: State of Mexico, Mexico
- Part of: Teotihuacan

History
- Built: c. 150–200 CE
- Built for: Quetzalcōātl

Site notes
- Height: 20 m

The Temple of the Feathered Serpent is the third largest pyramid at Teotihuacan, a pre-Columbian site in central Mexico (the term Teotihuacan, or Teotihuacano, is also used for the whole civilization and cultural complex associated with the site). This pre-Columbian city rose around the first or second century BCE and its occupation prolonged through to the 600s or 700s. Early growth of the population was relatively quick, with an estimated population of 60,000-80,000 inhabitants; it is suggested that the population reached up to 100,000 by the 300s

By the 200s, Teotihuacan had what is considered to be the largest complex of monumental structures in all of Mesoamerica. The Temple of the Feathered Serpent is only one of many grand features found at Teotihuacan, others include: the Sun Pyramid, the Moon Pyramid, the Avenue of the Dead, as well as the Ciudadela which encloses the Temple of the Feathered Serpent. With that, Teotihuacan is regarded as one of the most significant city-complexes in early Mesoamerica; it is also clear to see how its significant population is reflected by the monumental construction of the city itself.

The Temple of the Feathered Serpent is notable partly due to the discovery in the 1980s of more than a hundred possibly sacrificial victims buried beneath the structure. The burials, like the structure, are dated to between 150 and 200 CE. The pyramid takes its name from representations of the Mesoamerican "feathered serpent" deity which cover its sides. These are some of the earliest-known representations of the feathered serpent, often identified with the much-later Aztec god Quetzalcoatl. "Temple of the Feathered Serpent" is the modern-day name for the structure; it is also known as the Temple of Quetzalcoatl and the Feathered Serpent Pyramid.

== Location ==
The Temple of the Feathered Serpent is located at the southern end of the Avenue of the Dead, Teotihuacan's main thoroughfare, within the Ciudadela complex. The Ciudadela (Spanish, "citadel") is a structure with high walls and a large courtyard surrounding the temple. The Ciudadela's courtyard is massive enough that it could house the entire adult population of Teotihuacán within its walls, which was estimated to be one hundred thousand people at its peak. Within the Ciudadela there are several monumental structures, including the temple, two mansions north and south of the temple, and the Adosada platform. Built in the 4th century, the Adosada platform is located just in front (west) of the Temple of the Feathered Serpent, obscuring its view.

The Ciudadela also features apartment compounds surrounding the Feathered Serpent Pyramid. These are thought to have been occupied by individuals of elite status, specifically heads of the Teotihuacan state. In contrast, it is also thought that the Ciudadela was believed to be connected to the underworld and the administrative centers for the living world would have more likely been situated near the Sun and Moon Pyramids or along the Avenue of the Dead. Because the Ciudadela is much different from the other complexes at Teotihuacan, its purpose is regarded to be especially unique. While its size is only three fourths of that of the Sun Pyramid, much of its structure is attributed to the Feathered Serpent Pyramid as well as the great outer platforms.

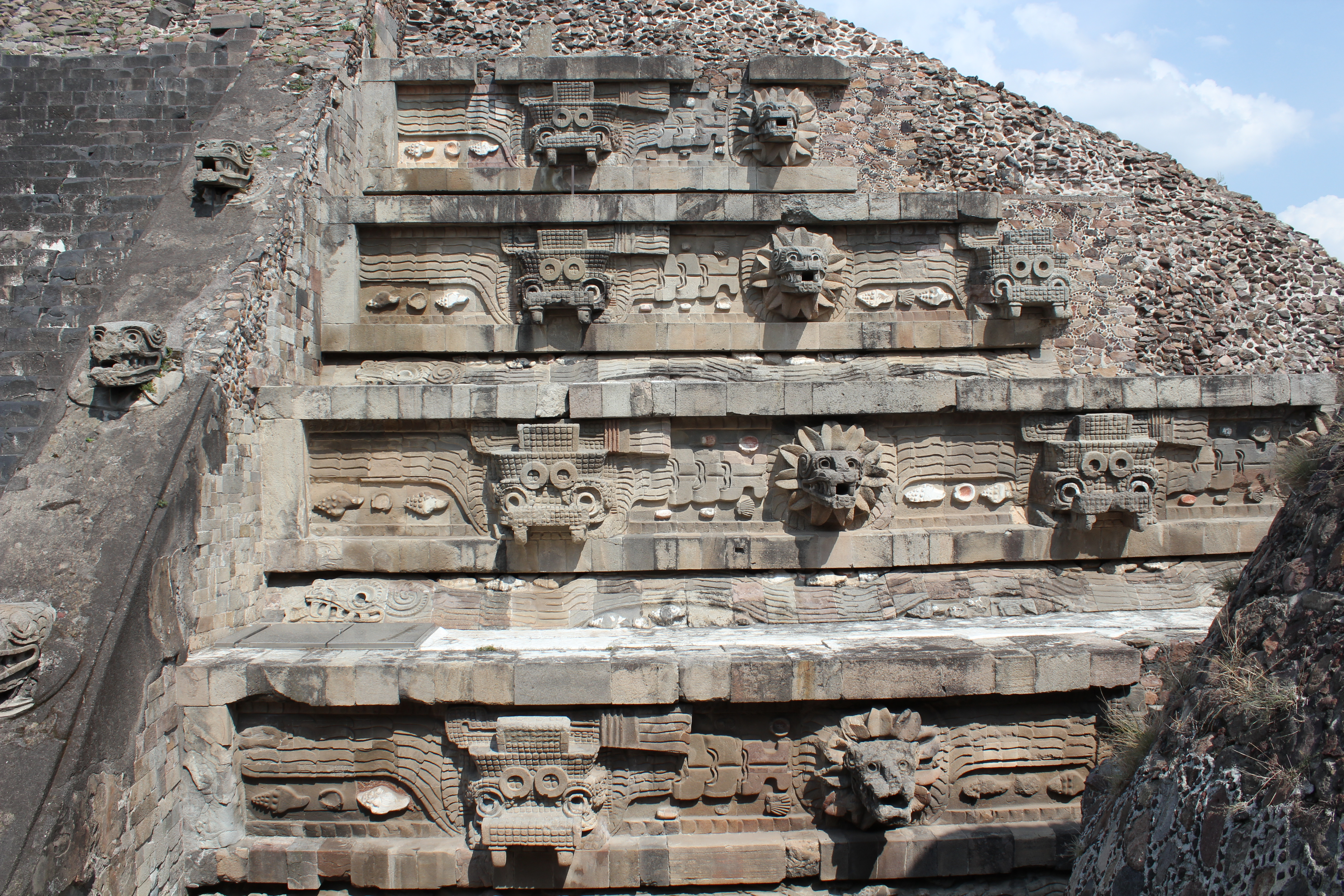
Detail of the pyramid, showing the alternating "Tlaloc" (left) and feathered serpent (right) heads. Note the long undulating feathered serpents in profile under the heads.

== Architecture ==
The Feathered Serpent Pyramid is a six-level step pyramid built in the talud-tablero style. The outside edges of each level are decorated with feathered serpent heads alternating with those of another snake-like creature, often identified as Tlaloc. Nevertheless, Mary Ellen Miller and Karl Taube claim that these heads may represent a "war serpent", while Michael D. Coe claims, somewhat similarly, that they probably represent the "fire serpent" wearing a headdress with the Teotihuacan symbol for war. In the eyes of these figures there is a spot for obsidian glass to be put in, so when the light hits, its eyes would glimmer. In antiquity the entire pyramid was painted – the background here was blue with carved sea shells providing decoration. Under each row of heads are bas-reliefs of the full feathered serpent, in profile, also associated with water symbols. These and other designs and architectural elements are more than merely decorative, suggesting "strong ideological significance", although there is no consensus just what that significance is. Some interpret the pyramid's iconography as cosmological in scope – a myth of the origin of time or of creation – or as calendrical in nature. Others find symbols of rulership, or war and the military.

Some archaeologists have searched for the significance of the Temple of the Feathered Serpent through analysis of the headdress worn by the Quetzalcoatl, or Feathered Serpent, that is featured on the outside of the pyramid. This depiction is described as a monstrous figure bearing large fangs, while lacking a lower jaw; the surface of the work has two quadrangular components, two rings on the forehead and a knot on the top. The knots have been considered to represent significance of the calendar, as they have proven to be throughout other instances of Teotihuacan iconography. Austin (et al.) goes into detail explaining the mythical significance of the Quetzalcoatl's headdress for which the following interpretation is based: the Quetzalcoatl was regarded as the “extractor-bearer” of the forces of time and is being depicted as “transporting time-destiny in the abstract to the surface of the earth”. This interpretation relies heavily on the signs of calendrical connection and significance exhibited by the architectural features of this pyramid.

Today the pyramid is largely hidden by the Adosada platform hinting at a political restructuring of Teotihuacan during the fourth century CE, perhaps a "rejection of autocratic rule" in favour of a collective leadership. Following excavations in the early 20th century, a section of a façade on the monument's west side was discovered. This section is believed to date from the late 3rd century. Fantastic and rare carvings on the surfaces show depictions of the feathered serpent deity, other gods, and seashells on panels on either side of a staircase.

=== Condition and conservation ===
Since the structure has been exposed to the elements for the entire duration of its history, rain and groundwater, crystallization of soluble salts on the surface, erosion, and biological growth have caused deterioration and loss of stone on the surface. Tourist visitation also accelerated the deterioration. In 2004, the Temple of Quetzalcoatl was listed in the 2004 World Monuments Watch by the World Monuments Fund. The organization provided assistance for conservation in cooperation with the Instituto Nacional de Antropología e Historia and with help from American Express.

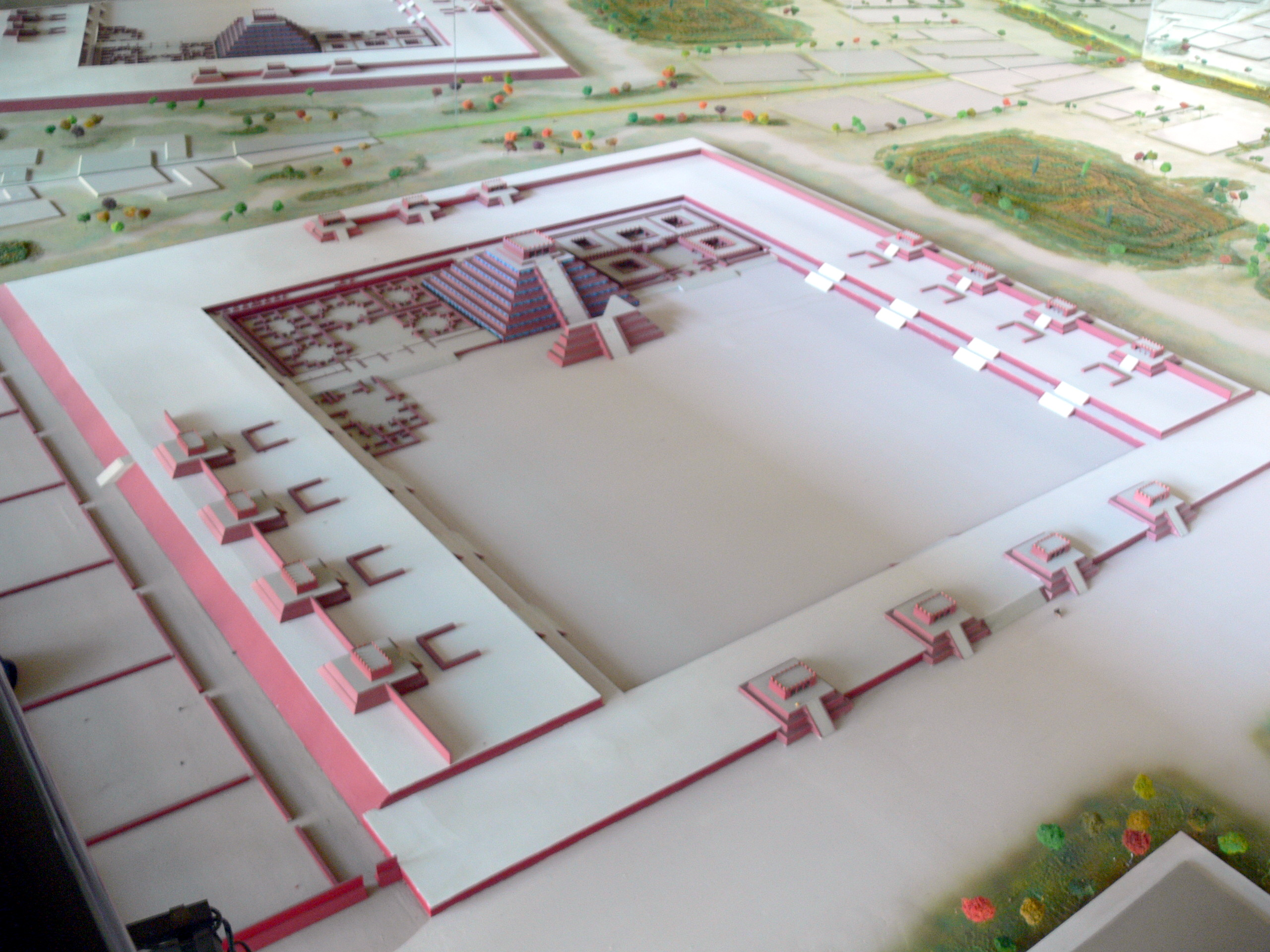
A reconstruction of the Ciudadela. The Temple of the Feathered Serpent can be seen at the upper center, with the Adosada directly in front of it.

== Symbolism and burials at the pyramid ==
Teotihuacan is also known for its involvement in warfare, as suggested by the observed emphasis on military elements and symbolism. Two hundred or more sacrificial burials were found at the pyramid, believed to be carried out during its construction and as part of the dedication of the temple.

The burials are grouped in various locations, the significance of which is not yet understood. While there are burials of both men and women, the males outnumber the females. The males were accompanied by the remains of weapons and accoutrements, such as necklaces of human teeth, that lead researchers to conclude that they were warriors, probably warriors in service to Teotihuacan rather than captives from opposing armies. Many of the individuals buried among the weapons were also found to be dressed in military garments. This has served as a major influence in the interpretations regarding the meaning behind the Temple's burials.

In addition to that, two large pits beneath the Temple were found, located at the front of its stairway. It is thought that this may have possessed the remains of Teotihuacan's past rulers. However, these chambers were looted during the time of this city's occupation, so it is unclear whether these sacrificed victims were placed to accompany these rulers in the afterlife. The richness of the burial goods generally increases toward the center of the pyramid. At least three degrees of status have been identified, although there is no indication of a dead ruler or other obvious focal point.

The sacrificed individuals, as well as the grave goods, were deliberately positioned into highly structured arrangements. Sugiyama argues that this positioning was related to the calendar system and symbolism of creation. In addition to those already mentioned, there are a few ideas about who exactly these sacrificial victims were, and what role they played in early Mesoamerican society. It is possible that they were war enemies or maybe low-status individuals dressed as soldiers that lived in Teotihuacan. Cowgill argues that these victims were a part of the royal household and that the individuals dressed in military attire were elite guardsmen.

Because of the apparent militant focus in the burials at the Feathered Serpent Pyramid, many believe it to be associated with symbolism of warfare. Cowgill explains that most believe the Feathered Serpent as a symbol itself is linked to a sacred Venus-related war; some have also considered the figure that alternates with Feathered Serpent to represent a solar fire or war serpent. In addition, animals have been used to depict symbols of many kinds, those predatorial are especially linked to power and oftentimes associated with warfare activity. The Feathered Serpent is one of the earliest “fierce” animals and is visualized as a rattlesnake with bird-like feathers and a snout of a feline.

A specific grave good found among these burials was identified as a nose pendant resembling a “butterfly” shape. These were found in the burial at the center of the Temple of the Feathered Serpent. However, these pendants have been recognized instead as the ending segment of a rattlesnake's rattling tail. It is thought that those who adorned themselves with such pendants possibly identified or resonated with the Feathered Serpent in a higher sense.

== Later discoveries ==
In late 2003 a tunnel beneath the Temple of the Feathered Serpent was accidentally discovered by Sergio Gómez Chávez and Julie Gazzola, archaeologists of the National Institute of Anthropology and History (INAH). After days of heavy rain Gómez Chávez noticed that a nearly three-foot-wide sinkhole occurred near the foot of the temple pyramid.

First trying to examine the hole with a flashlight from above Gómez could see only darkness, so tied with a line of heavy rope around his waist he was lowered by several colleagues, and descending into the murk he realized it was a perfectly cylindrical shaft. At the bottom he came to rest in apparently ancient construction – a man-made tunnel, blocked in both directions by immense stones. Gómez was aware that archaeologists had previously discovered a narrow tunnel underneath the Pyramid of the Sun, and supposed he was now observing a kind of similar mirror tunnel, leading to a subterranean chamber beneath Temple of the Feathered Serpent. He decided initially to elaborate a clear hypothesis and to obtain approval. Meanwhile, he erected a tent over the sinkhole to preserve it from the hundreds of thousands of tourists who visit Teotihuacán. Researchers reported that the tunnel was believed to have been sealed in 200 CE.

Preliminary planning of the exploration and fundraising took more than six years. Before the start of excavations, beginning in the early months of 2004, Dr. Victor Manuel Velasco Herrera determined with the help of ground-penetrating radar and a team of some 20 archaeologists and workers the approximate length of the tunnel and the presence of internal chambers. They scanned the earth under the Ciudadela, returning every afternoon to upload the results to Gómez's computers. By 2005, the digital map was complete. The archaeologists explored the tunnel with a remote-controlled robot called Tlaloc II-TC, equipped with an infrared camera and a laser scanner that generates 3D visualization to perform three dimensional register of the spaces beneath the temple. A small opening in the tunnel wall was made and the scanner captured the first images, 37 meters into the passage.

In 2009, the government granted Gómez permission to dig. By the end of 2009 archaeologists of the INAH located the entrance to the tunnel that leads to galleries under the pyramid, where the remains of rulers of the ancient city might have been deposited. In August 2010 Gómez Chávez, director of Tlalocan Project: Underground Road announced the advancement of investigation conducted by INAH in the tunnel closed nearly 1,800 years ago by Teotihuacan dwellers. INAH team, consisted of about 30 persons supported with national and international advisors of the highest scientific level, intended to enter the tunnel in September–October 2010. This excavation, the deepest made at the pre-Columbian site, was part of the commemorations of the 100th anniversary of archaeological excavations at Teotihuacan and its opening to public.

It was mentioned that the underground passage runs under Feathered Serpent Temple, and the entrance is located a few meters away from the temple at the expected place, designedly sealed with large boulders nearly 2,000 years ago. The hole that had appeared during the 2003 storms was not the actual entrance. A vertical shaft, almost 5 meters wide, accesses the tunnel: it goes 14 meters deep, and the entrance leads to a nearly 100-meter-long corridor that ends in a series of underground galleries in the rock. After archaeologists broke ground at the entrance of the tunnel, a staircase and ladders (and later an elevator) were installed to allow easy access to the subterranean site. Work advanced at a slow and careful pace. Excavating was done manually, with spades. Nearly 1,000 tons of soil and debris were removed from the tunnel. The rich array of objects unearthed included: large spiral seashells, jaguar bones, pottery, fragments of human skin, wooden masks covered with inlaid rock jade and quartz, elaborate necklaces, rings, greenstone crocodile teeth and human figurines, crystals shaped into eyes, beetle wings arranged in a box, sculptures of jaguars, and hundreds of metallized spheres. The mysterious globes lay in both the north and south chambers. Ranging from 40 to 130 millimetres, the balls have a core of clay and are covered with a yellow jarosite formed by the oxidation of pyrite. According to George Cowgill from Arizona State University, "Pyrite was certainly used by the Teotihuacanos and other ancient Mesoamerican societies. Originally the spheres would have shone brilliantly. They are indeed unique, but I have no idea what they mean." All these artifacts were deposited deliberately and pointedly, as if in offering to appease the gods.

At the end of the tunnel is a chamber representing the underworld, or a microcosm of the Teotihuacan civilization. About 17 metres beneath the pyramid's center, a miniature mountainous landscape was used to hold objects, including a rubber ball (used in the Mesoamerican ballgame) representing the Sun. Pools of liquid mercury in some of the tiny valleys represented lakes. Also found were four greenstone statues, wearing garments and beads, and their open eyes would have shone with precious minerals. Two of the figurines were still in their original positions, leaning back and apparently contemplating up at the axis where the three planes of the universe meet – probably the founding shamans of Teotihuacan, guiding pilgrims to the sanctuary, and carrying bundles of sacred objects used to perform rituals, including pendants and pyrite mirrors, which were perceived as portals to other realms. The walls and ceiling of the tunnel were found to have been carefully impregnated with mineral powder composed of magnetite, pyrite, and hematite, providing a special brightness to the place and to give the effect of standing under the stars as a peculiar re-creation of the underworld.

After each new segment was cleared, the 3D scanner documented the progress. By 2015 nearly 75,000 fragments of artifacts have been discovered, studied, cataloged, analyzed and, when possible, restored. The significance of these new discoveries is publicly explored in a major exhibition which opened at the end of September 2017 at the De Young Museum in San Francisco.

== Relation to the calendar ==
There was an apparent correlation between the Temple of the Feathered Serpent and the calendar. The pyramid also is thought to contain two hundred and sixty feathered serpent heads between the platforms. Each of these feathered serpents also contains an open area in its mouth. This open area is big enough to put a place holder in. Thus, it is believed that the people of Teotihuacán would move this place marker around the pyramid to represent the ritual calendar. When a spiritual day would arrive the people would gather within the walls of the Ciudadela and celebrate the ritual.

== Political influences ==
The Temple of the Feathered Serpent was not only a religious center but also a political center. The rulers of Teotihuacán were not only the leaders of men; they were also the spiritual leaders of the city. The two mansions near the pyramid are thought to have been occupied by powerful families.

An interesting feature of the Feathered Serpent Pyramid is that there are examples of a shift in power or ideology in Teotihuacán and for the Pyramid itself. The construction of the Adosada platform came much later than the Feathered Serpent Pyramid. The Adosada platform is built directly in front of the pyramid and blocks its front view. Thus, it is thought that the political leaders lost favor or that the ideology of the Feathered Serpent Pyramid lost virtue, and so was covered up by the Adosada.

In 378 a group of Teotihuacanos organized a coup d'etat in Tikal, Guatemala. This was not the Teotihuacan state; it was a group of the Feathered-Serpent people, thrown out from the city. The Feathered-Serpent Pyramid was burnt, all the sculptures were torn from the temple, and another platform was built to efface the facade ...

In addition to that, it is also thought that this destructive event was due to a shift in ideas around the construction of pyramids. From around the middle of the 200s until the 700s, Teotihuacan's population was significantly high as was the amount of monumental construction. This construction was, however, not for the purpose of expanding residential structures or compounds; it was mainly focused on expanding and modifying complexes that already existed. But, it was also found that during this time, substantial apartment compounds were built; it seems they quickly housed almost all residents of low, intermediate, and high statuses. This suggests a possibility that people's concerns had shifted towards constructing more residential buildings in order to support the high population, rather than additions to pre-existing monuments. In a broad sense, this demonstrates a shift towards concerns about well-being in contrast to individual glory. All of this in mind, the destruction of the Feathered Serpent Pyramid has been viewed as a “revolt” against what may have been deemed as the unnecessary construction of pre-existing monuments given that the necessity of residential construction was increasing.

Excavations led by Cowgill in 1988-1989 revealed that the Pyramid of the Feathered Serpent was burned in a hot fire, and that large fragments of clay walls and other debris caused by the event were implemented in the construction of the Adosada Platform. Rather than being covered by the construction of another grand pyramid, the Feathered Serpent Pyramid was left exposed and unmodified, which led to further damage. It is thought that this may have been purposeful, serving as a reminder to future rulers to avoid temptations to overstep. Cowgill believes that this may have been when looting took place at the Pyramid and tunnels were dug into the structure. He also believes that there is a possibility that if the sacrificed victims were loyal high-status individuals, and if these events occurred soon after the Pyramid's initial construction, the elite group may have viewed the sacrifices as excessive and instigated the monument's destruction.

== Gallery ==
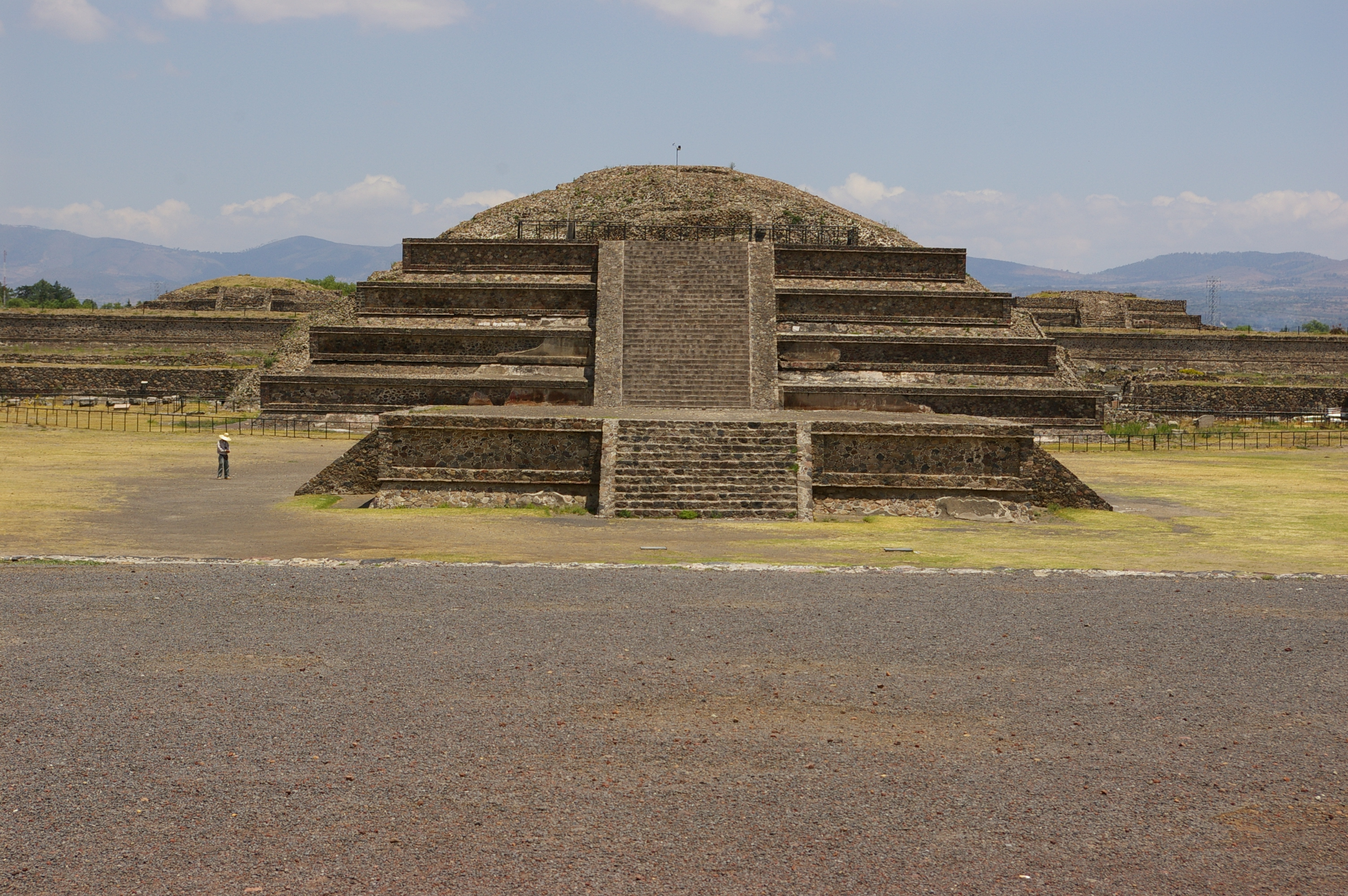
Adosada platform in the midground, Pyramid of the Feathered Serpent behind the platform, person beside a small platform in the foreground gives scale

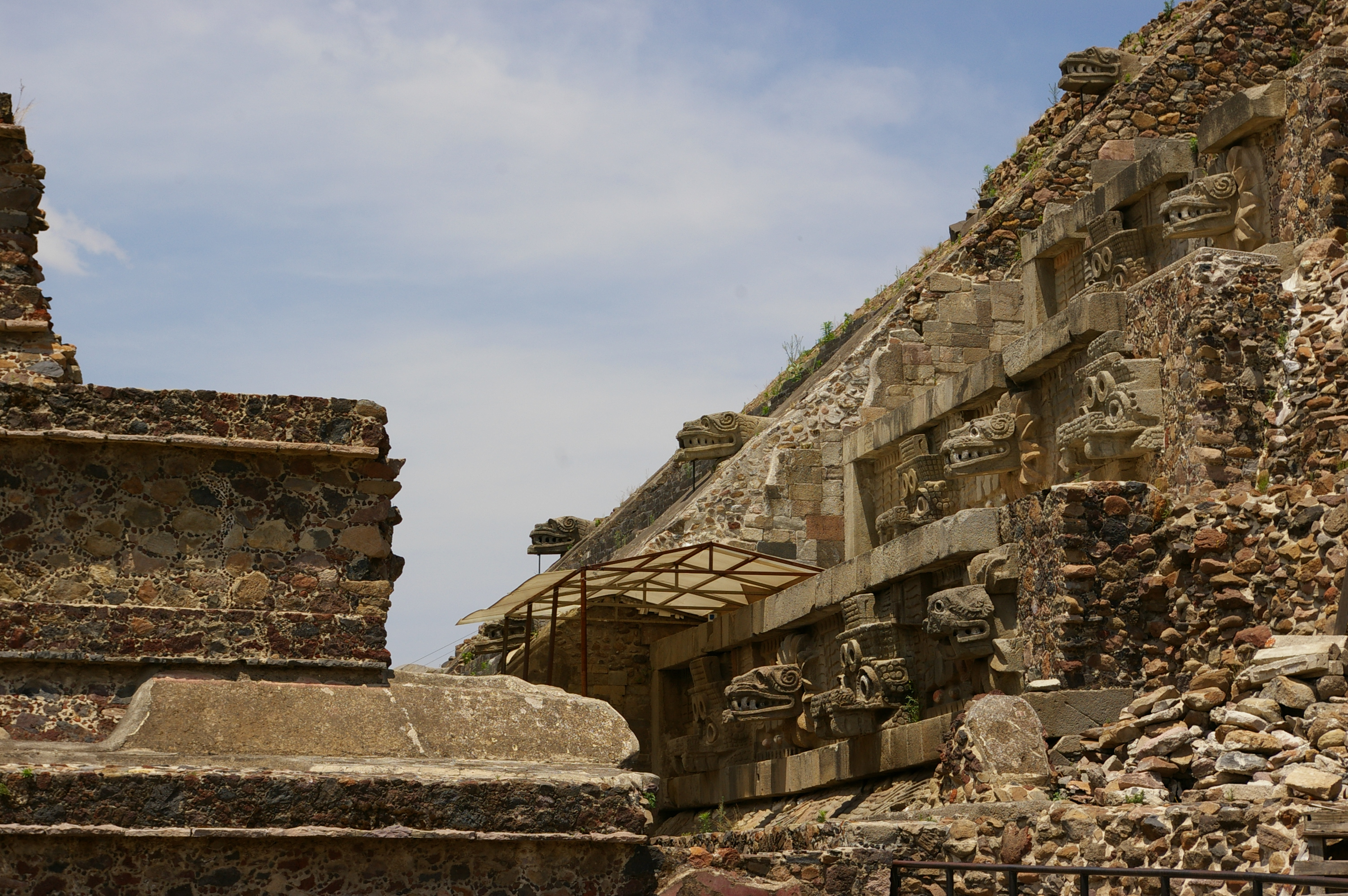
Pyramid of the Feathered Serpent and the Adosada platform

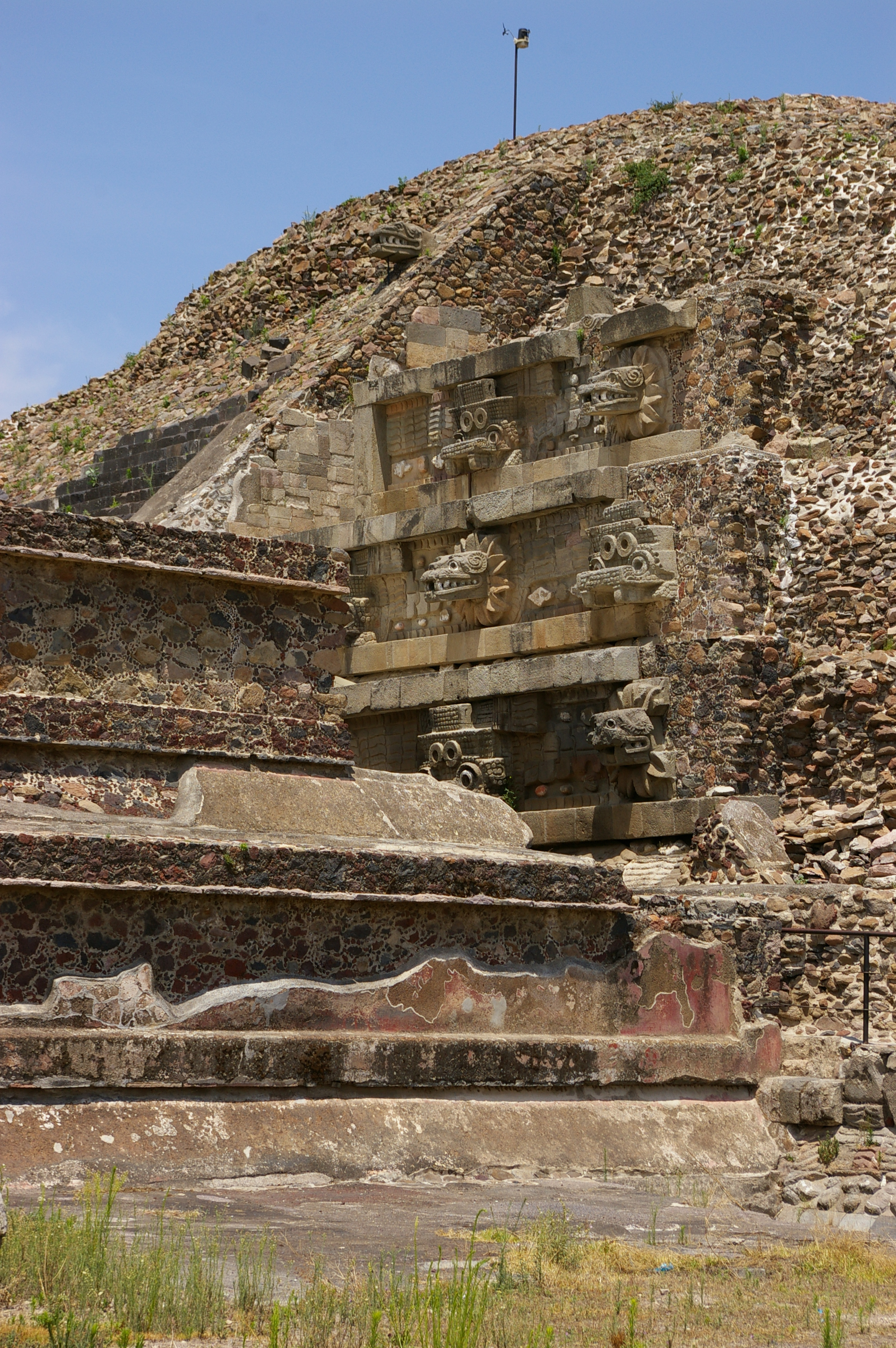
Pyramid of the Feathered Serpent and the Adosada platform

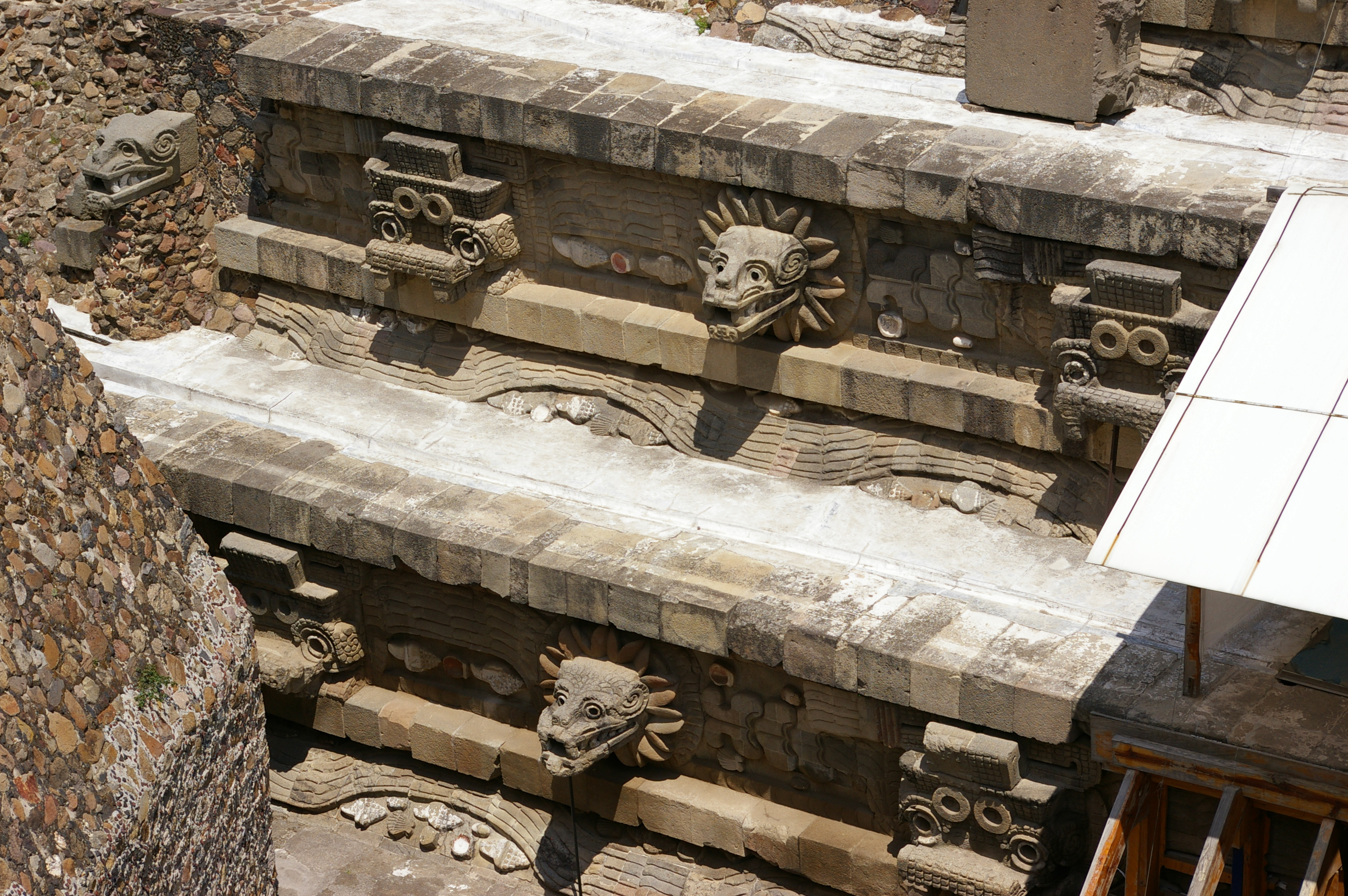
View of the Pyramid architectural detail to the left of the steps

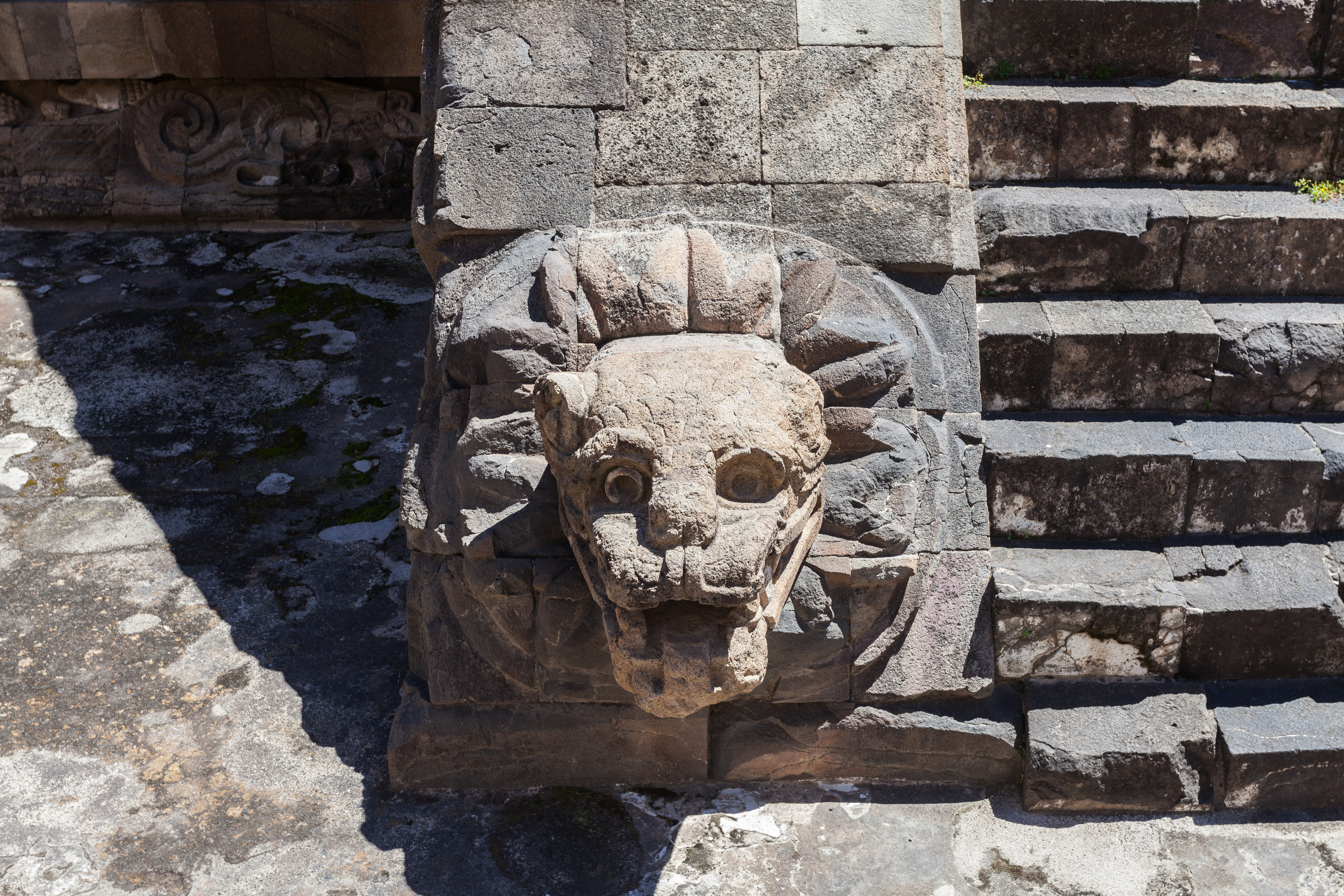
Detail of a head

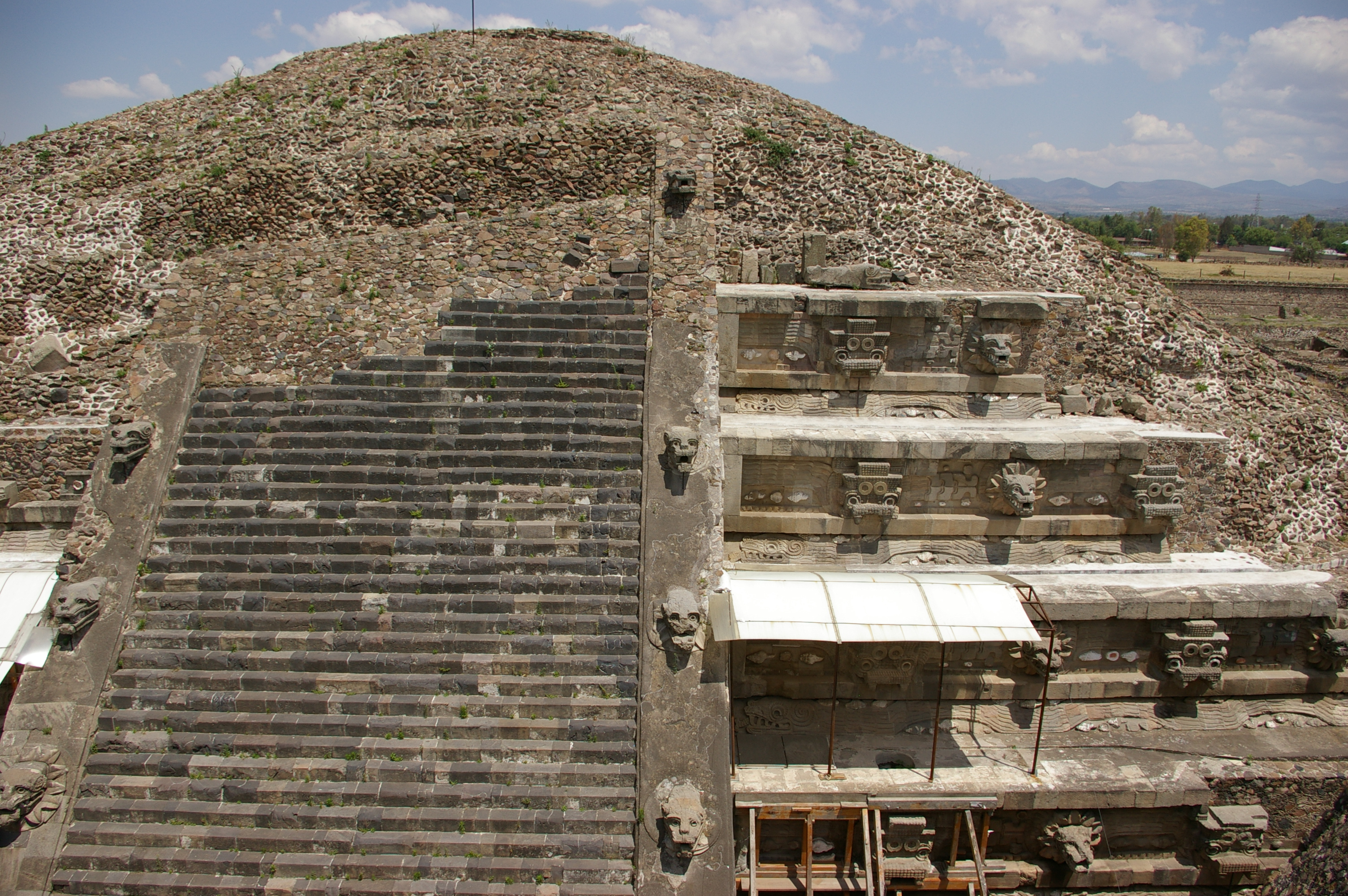
Stairs
