= Tlaloc (disambiguation) =

Tlaloc may refer to:

- Tláloc, the Aztec god of rain
- Tláloc (Mexibús), a BRT station in Chimalhuacán, State of Mexico
- Cerro Tláloc, a mountain and archaeological site in the State of Mexico
- Tlaloc monolith, a pre-Hispanic sculpture currently located outside the National Museum of Anthropology in Mexico City
- Tlaloc II-TC, a robot designed for archaeological exploration deployed at Teotihuacan
- Tlaloc (fish), a genus of fish
- Tlaloc Rivas, a Mexican-American writer
- Tlaloc, a fictional character from the Legends of Dune books
- Tlaloc, a fictional character and the main villain from the Tak and the Power of Juju series of video games.
