= Kagome =

Kagome may refer to:

- Kagome lattice, a two-dimensional lattice pattern found in the crystal structure of many natural minerals
- Kagome crest, a star shaped symbol related to the lattice design and present in many Shinto shrines
- Kagome Kagome, a popular children's game in Japan
- Kagome Higurashi, the female protagonist in the manga and anime series InuYasha
- Kagome Co., Ltd., a food and beverage company in Japan
