= Mesoamerican Ballgame Association USA =

- Sport: Ulama (de Cadera)
- Founded: 2019
- First season: 2023
- Organising body: International Mesoamerican Ball Game Association
- No. of teams: 3
- Country: United States
- International cup: Mesoamerican Ball Game Championship

The Mesoamerican Ballgame Association USA or AJUPEME USA (Asociacion de Juego de Pelota Mesoamericano USA) is the main sports organization for Ulama de Cadera in the United States. It is a member of the International Mesoamerican Hip Ball Game Association based in Mexico.

== Format ==
AJUPEME USA plays Ulama de Cadera, or hip ulama, meaning it plays the iteration of Ulama with hips.

Players wear suede and leather around the midsection and a faja, a woven belt. An 8-lb rubber ball that is approximately 8 inches in diameter is used to play Ulama de Cadera. The ball is made from the rubber of an Arbol de Castilla tree and sulfur.

=== Gameplay ===
In the US version of ulama de cadera, each ulama team has seven players on the field at any time. The game has two halves with 20-minutes each, with a ten-minute halftime. Players can only contact the ball with their hips.

== Domestic teams ==
Within AJUPEME USA, there are currently four delegations: California, Nevada, Arizona Practice, and Yankwik Mexiko (New Mexico). Each delegation governs the sport in each of their respective states.

Map of AJUPEME teams

AJUPEME USA teams
| Team | Location | Delegation | Est | Venue | Note |
|---|---|---|---|---|---|
| Oceyolotl de San Fernando Valley | San Fernando, CA | California | 2019 | El Cariso Community Regional Park | Formerly Itzpapalotl San Fernando Valley |
| New Mexico Macanas | Albuquerque, NM | Yankwik Mexiko | 2022 | Mesa Verde Community Center | |
| Atlético Tlecoyotes de San Diego | San Diego, CA | California | 2023 | Chicano Park | |
| TBD | Yuma, AZ | Arizona Practice | TBD | | |

Las Vegas Nevada

== National team ==
National record of AJUPEME USA:

International Hipball Championship/ Mesoamerican Ball Game Championship
| Year | Host | Ranking |
|---|---|---|
| 2019 | Orange Walk Town, Belize | 3rd place |
| 2022 | Xcaret, Quintana Roo, Mexico | 3rd place |
