= La víbora de la mar =

Traditional Mexican singing game

LA VÍBORA DE LA MAR (lit. The sea snake) is a traditional singing game originating in Mexico. Participants hold hands creating the “snake” and they run around the playground. It is a popular children's game in Mexico and Latin America, and also in Spain where it is known as "pasemisín". This game has become a tradition at Mexican weddings. The bride and groom stand up high on chairs and are encircled and held by family members representing the family union and support towards them. Meanwhile, other participants will form the “snake” and dance and bump against them, trying to knock them off the chairs, representing all the obstacles and problems that may try to bring them down. Family and friends try to keep the couple standing on their chairs, symbolizing that they will keep the couple together and support them through adversity.

== The game ==
Children form a line holding each other's waist or clothing, and two other children raise their arms together to form an arch. Of the two children forming the arch, one of them is "Melón" (Honeydew or Cantaloupe) the other is "Sandía." (Watermelon)

The children begin to sing the song, as the "snake" begins to run (without separating) passing repeatedly under the arch. The lyrics of the song are such that the last of the word of each stanza can be repeated at will, and the children might decide to bring the arch down to "capture" someone. The fun in the game is not knowing when the arch will fall, "capturing" one of the children.

The children who form the arch then ask: "With whom will you stay? Melón or Sandía?" The captured child must then queue up next to the "fruit" of his choice, thereby forming another arch through which the line must pass.

Once all children that formed the original line are divided between "melón" and "sandía", the resulting queues must compete in a game of tug of war.

== The Verses ==
The words to the song are:

Spanish:
"A la víbora, víbora
de la mar, de la mar
por aquí pueden pasar.
Los de adelante corren mucho
y los de atrás se quedarán
tras, tras, tras, tras.

Una mexicana que fruta vendía
ciruela, chabacano, melón o sandía.
Verbena, verbena, jardín de matatena.
Verbena, verbena, la virgen de la cueva.
Campanita de oro déjame pasar,
Con todos mis hijos menos el de atrás
Tras, tras, tras, tras.
Será melón, será sandía
será la vieja del otro día
día, día, día, día.

El puente está quebrado,
que lo manden componer
Con cáscaras de huevo
y pedazos de oropel
pel, pel, pel, pel."

English Translation:
"To the snake, the snake
Of the sea, of the sea
All of you can pass through here,
Those up front run quickly
Those at back are left behind
'hind, 'hind, 'hind, 'hind.

One Mexican (woman), who sold fruits
Plums, apricots, cantaloupes or watermelons
Verbena, verbena, garden of jacks
Verbena, verbena, the virgin of the cave
Little golden bell, let me pass
With all my children, except the one that's last
Last, last, last, last.
Will it be cantaloupe? Will it be watermelon?
Will it be the old lady we saw the other day?
Day, day, day, day.

The bridge is broken
Send someone to have it fixed
With broken bits of eggshells
And pieces of aluminum foil
Foil, foil, foil, foil".

== Variations ==
In Mexico, it has become quite popular to play this game at weddings. In this variation, single men and women are often divided, the groom and bride standing on chairs to form the arch under which everyone passes. (The groom often uses the veil or train of the bride's dress). In this case, the song is not sung, and the rhythm of music is followed, which gets faster and faster, the participants struggling to keep the "snake" together, while running through tables, chairs and the couple. At the end of the game, depending on the sex of the participants, the bride throws from her chair the wedding bouquet, and the groom the garter. The bouquet used to be a symbol of happiness, but in today's practice the single woman who catches the bouquet is believed to be the next to marry. Same goes to the single man who catches the garter. In some instances, it is said that they will marry each other.

In Spain the game is known as "pasemisí".

== Similar games in other traditions ==
Similar games such as these exist in other traditions as well. This game can be likened to "London Bridge is Falling Down" in English-speaking countries, and a similar game in Japan exists, played to a song called Toryanse.
