= Kagome Kagome =

Japanese children's game

Kagome Kagome
Kagome Kagome sung by Hatsune Miku from Vocaloid

"Kagome Kagome" (かごめかごめ or 籠目籠目) is a Japanese children's game and the song (Warabe uta) associated with it. One player is chosen as the Oni (literally demon or ogre, but similar to the concept of "it" in tag) and sits blindfolded (or with their eyes covered). The other children join hands and walk in circles around the Oni while chanting the song for the game. When the song stops, the Oni tries to name the person standing directly behind them.

The song is a subject of much interest because of its cryptic lyrics which vary from region to region. Various interpretations exist, but the originally intended meaning, as well as the song’s lyricist and composer, is unknown.

== Lyrics ==
The most common interpretation is:

Kagome, kagome / The bird in the cage,
When, oh when will it come out? In the evening of the dawn,
The crane and the turtle slipped,
Who is behind you now?

As the song is typically written in a single line without any punctuation, in addition to the odd phrasing and ambiguous words, it is also unclear which phrases are connected to which (for example, "in the evening of the dawn" could be an answer to "when oh when will it come out," or could be a setting for "the crane and the turtle slipped").

The song's lyrics vary by region. Common variations in the song include replacing "夜明けの晩に" (yoake no ban ni) ("in the evening of the dawn") with "夜明けの番人" (yoake no bannin) ("the watchman of the dawn"), and "後ろの正面" (ushiro no shoumen) ("the front of the back") with "後ろの少年" (ushiro no shounen) ("the boy behind"). There are countless variations in history, many of which can be found recorded in writing.

== Meaning ==
The game, played mainly by children, begins with a blindfolded child surrounded by several other children who chant "Kagome, Kagome." Here, "kagome" is a polysemous word (pivot word) with multiple meanings, such as "surround," "basket woman," "a woven bamboo pattern with gaps," and "crouch." Next, "kago no naka no tori wa" (the bird in the basket) shifts the meaning of the opening "kagome" to "seagull" (kamome), giving the surrounded child the meaning of "a bird being surrounded" or "a bird in a cage." Then, "itsu itsu deyaru" (when, oh when will it come out) creates a sense of anticipation about "when the bird will leave the cage" or "when the answer will be revealed," while simultaneously serving as a metaphor for "the bird meeting someone," adding to the ambiguity. Following this, "yoake no ban ni" (on the evening of the dawn) uses the contradiction of "an evening after dawn" and the inversion of "the order of morning and night being reversed" to create an amusing sense of doubt and confusion. Then, "tsuru to kame ga subetta" (the crane and the turtle slipped) shifts the bird from a "seagull" to a "crane," inducing a sense of anticlimax that "the bird met a turtle," and serves as a metaphor for failure, meaning "the auspicious crane and turtle slipped and fell." Finally, "ushiro no shoumen daare" (who is in the front behind you) presents the contradiction of "front even though it's behind" and the ambiguity of "guess who is right behind you."

Many theories surround the meanings of the various phrases in the song. These include:

=== Kagome ===
- Kagome, meaning the woven pattern of a bamboo basket.
- A corruption of "kakome" (surround). In other words, when playing the game, everyone calls out "kakome, kakome" (surround, surround).
- A corruption of "kagame" (crouch). In other words, when playing the game, the children are telling the "oni" (it) to "kagame, kagame" (crouch, crouch).
- The shape of a kagome pattern, meaning a hexagon or hexagram.
- Written as "kagome" (籠女) (basket woman), it refers to a woman who looks like she is holding a basket, meaning a pregnant woman.
- The bamboo fence surrounding an execution ground.
- "Kagome" is "kagume" (神具女) (divine tool woman) or "kaguume" (神宮女) (shrine woman). That is, a woman possessing a divine aura, meaning a miko (shrine maiden, prophet) or saiō who performs prayers, which have been deeply worshipped in Japan since ancient times.

=== Kago no naka no tori wa ===
- It means "a bird in a cage," and considering the customs of the time, the bird is a chicken.
- In the game, the person who becomes the "oni" (it) is likened to "a bird in a cage."
- It refers to something that exists in the center of a figure formed by connecting certain points in the shape of a kagome (a woven bamboo pattern, typically a hexagon or pentagram).
- Interpreted as "a torii gate in a basket," it represents a small torii gate surrounded by a basket, or a shrine surrounded by a bamboo fence.
- It refers to what is inside a kagome (pregnant woman), meaning a fetus.
- "Tori" = the person who takes the "tori" (取り) (the final act of the day). The person who performs the closing act at a festival or similar event. The person who brings up the rear, rounding everyone up so no one is left behind, and brings things to a close.

=== Itsu itsu deyaru ===
- It means "When, oh when, will we meet?"
- It means "When, oh when, will you leave?"
- It means "When, oh when, can I leave?"
- It means "When, oh when, will it appear?"

=== Yoake no ban ni ===
- "The evening of the dawn" (yoake no ban) means "dawn = the end of night, the beginning of morning" and "evening = dusk, night," thus referring to "just after midnight."
- It means "the watchman of the dawn" (yoake no bannin), referring to the bird in the cage, which is a rooster.
- "In the evening of the dawn" means "from dawn until evening," representing the passage of time "from early morning until late at night."
- "The evening of the dawn" means the time just before seeing the light, which from a fetus's perspective corresponds to the final month of pregnancy.
- "Dawn" is when the day breaks, and "evening" is the night. Therefore, "the evening of the dawn" refers to a time that does not exist.
- "The evening of the dawn" means "a night that could also be called dawn," referring to the time around 4:00 AM.
- The "evening (night)" of the "morning" represents a state where the normal concept of time is distorted. In other words, it is not the real world.

=== Tsuru to kame ga subetta ===
- It is "the crane and the turtle slipped," and since two auspicious symbols slip, it represents a good omen (or a bad omen).
- It is "the crane and the turtle 'ruled' (統べった, subetta)," representing a ruler (or building) symbolized by the crane and the turtle.
- It is "the crane and the turtle ruled/slipped," which is a play on words for the ruler symbolized by the crane and the turtle "ruling" and "slipping."
- It is "the crane and the turtle slipped," and since two symbols of longevity slip, it represents death.
- It is a variation of the lyrics of a children's song passed down in Kyoto, "tsurutsuru tsuppaita," meaning "dragged along."
- It compares contrasting things, "a symbol of heaven" and "a symbol of the earth."
- It refers to symmetry breaking or being broken.

=== Ushiro no shoumen daare ===
- "Ushiro no shoumen" (the front of the back) means directly behind, asking, "Who is right behind you?"
- "Ushiro no shoumen" refers to the back (dorsal side) of the "oni" (the person who is "it").
- It means "When you turn around, who is the person standing in front of you?" By extension, it represents an opposing entity, a shadow mastermind, or a possessing spirit.
- A severed head rolls away, and while the body faces forward, the head faces backward, asking, "Who killed me?"
- Alternatively, it depicts a state where the victim is unaware of their own death, wondering whose headless body lies before them.
- However, in some regions, the lyrics for the "shoumen" part are sometimes sung as "shounen" (boy).

== Theories ==
The song is a subject of much academic interest and many theories surround its origin and meaning. Some such theories are:

The lyrics refer to the game only (adopted by Japanese dictionaries, etc.)
The bird in the cage = the "oni" (it), interpreted as "Surround, surround, when will the person who is 'it' be able to switch with the next person and come out? Who is directly behind you?" However, regarding the "crane and turtle slipped" part, many vaguely explain it as being "to match the rhythm and meter."
The song is about a prostitute
It expresses the sorrow of a prostitute with no freedom (a bird in a cage) who is forced to entertain men all day long (on the evening of the dawn) (the crane and turtle slipped), and while lamenting when she will be able to escape from here (when, oh when will it come out), the face of her next client (who is directly behind you) is already coming into view.
The song is about a pregnant woman
"Kagome" is written as basket woman, indicating a woman who looks like she is holding a basket on her stomach—a pregnant woman—and the "bird in the basket" refers to the unborn child. Her family was in the middle of an inheritance dispute, and some were unhappy about the addition of even one more potential heir. One evening at dawn, close to her due date, the pregnant woman was about to go down the stairs when someone pushed her in the back, causing her to fall and suffer a miscarriage. This theory claims the song expresses the mother's grudge, asking who pushed her and killed her child.
The song is about a prisoner
"Kagome" refers to a basket, meaning a prison, as if asking the prison to "lock them up." The bird in the basket, or the "it" (oni), is a prisoner. The crane and turtle slipping represents something unlucky, namely an escape or execution. "Who stands right behind you?" refers to a guard coming to fetch a death row inmate, or someone assisting in a prison break. Who exactly is coming? What will their fate be?
The song is about a divine revelation
A theory that the song is about a person's spiritual awakening and enlightenment, where "the bird in the cage" means "a person who has self-identified with their physical body and is trapped in it," "when, oh when will it come out" means "when will they realize that their physical body is not themselves," and "the crane and turtle slipped" means "yin and yang have been unified," i.e., when they "awaken," "who is right behind you?" = who is "yourself"?

== See also ==
- Warabe uta
- "Tōryanse"
- As the Gods Will
