= Kimbomba =

Kimbomba (which is the name of the stick with tips used in the game) is a traditional game played in the center and south of Mexico. Originally it was played by Maya children. This game is mainly played by children over 6 years. To play kimbomba one needs a place without obstacles and two round sticks: a 10 in long stick and a 5 in long conical stick with tips (a kimbomba). A player stands in a base similar to a baseball base, then, he takes the longer stick and hits the kimbomba, which is on the ground. The shorter stick is raised and the player hits it again, like a baseball. There are two versions but in both it is necessary to get the stick as far away as possible. At least two players are needed.

== Versions ==
Many versions have been created through time. In all of them the player stands inside a 2-meter circle, which in its center has a 15 cm square where the kimbomba is located. The kimbomba is hit and then, the game starts. For both versions it is necessary that each player has their pair of sticks.

=== Version 1: Individual ===
Each player hits his kimbomba and hits it as far away as possible. After every hit a referee measures the distance that the kimbomba reached. The longest distance reached is marked with a stake on the ground. Once the referee has measured the distance, it is the turn of the next player. The winner is the one who hits the kimbomba further. The maximum number of players that can play this version is 10.

=== Version 2: Teams ===
This one is not uniform like the first version because the rules and the way to make points change according to the place where it is played, but they all are similar to baseball. In addition to the original circle, there are 3 bases: first, second and third base.

There are 2 teams that take turns batting, there's not a specific number of players per team but 5 players is the maximum recommended. One team hits the kimbomba while the other one tries to catch it.

From the circle, the first player of the first team on bat hits the kimbomba, then, the player leaves the stick inside the square and runs to the third base. If he reaches the third base before an opponent makes him an out, he scores one point. If one opponent catches the kimbomba in the air, they get one out. If the kimbomba hits the ground once, the opposite team can take the kimbomba and throw it to the square inside the base. If the kimbomba hits the other stick, then, they get one out.

After 3 outs the turn ends. The game finally ends when one of the teams got the points that were agreed on before the beginning of the game.

== Similar games around the world ==
=== Gilli-Danda ===
From India. There are two sticks, Danda is the longest one and Gilli the smallest.

=== Billarda ===
From Galicia, Spain. The billarda is the shortest stick, the longest one is called "stick to hit".
