= Ulama (game) =

Mexican sport

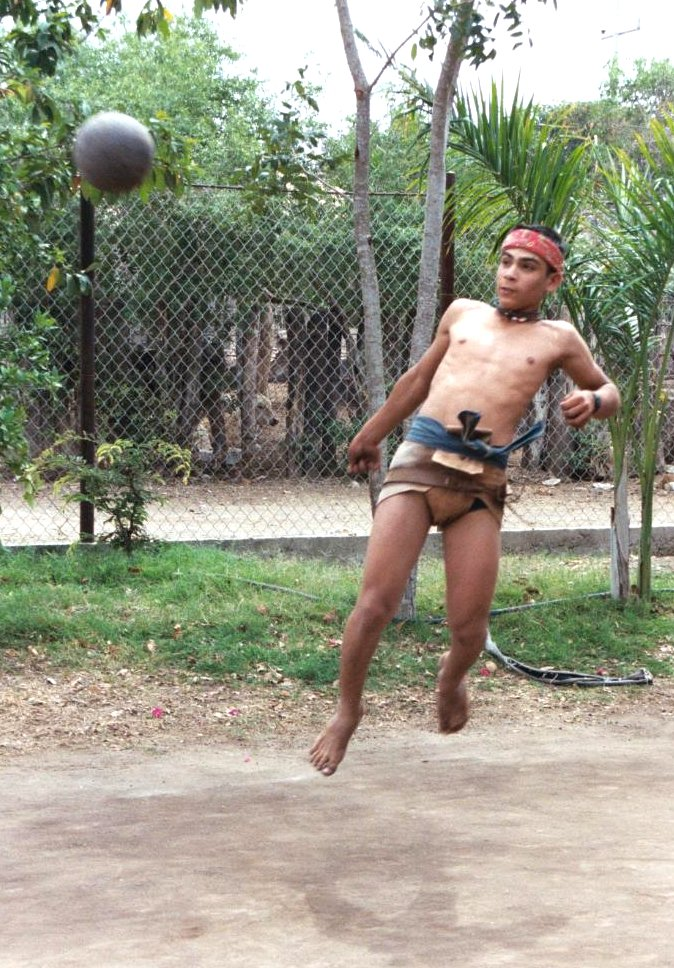
Sinaloan ulama player in action

Ulama (Spanish pronunciation: [uˈlama]) or ōllama (Nahuatl pronunciation: [ˈoːlːama]) is a ball game played in Mexico, currently experiencing a revival from its home in a few communities in the state of Sinaloa. As a descendant of the Aztec version of the Mesoamerican ballgame, the game is regarded as one of the oldest continuously played sports in the world and as the oldest known game using a rubber ball.

== History ==
The Nahuatl word ōllama 'ball capture' is truncated from ōllamaliztli (pronounced [oːlːamaˈlistɬi], lit. 'ball capturing game'), the Aztec name for the Mesoamerican ballgame related to the word ōlli ([ˈoːlːi] lit. 'rubber, rubber ball'). The roots of ōllamaliztli extend back to at least the 2nd millennium BC and evidence of which has been found in nearly all Mesoamerican cultures in an area extending from modern-day Mexico to El Salvador, and possibly in modern-day Arizona and New Mexico. Archaeologists have uncovered rubber balls dating to at least 1600 BC, ballgamer figures from at least 1200 BC, and nearly 1,500 ancient ball courts.

Due to its religious and ritual aspects, Spanish Catholics suppressed the game soon after the Spanish conquest. It survived in areas such as Sinaloa, where Spanish influence was less pervasive.

As part of its nationwide revival, the game now has a home in the capital Mexico City, at a cultural centre in the Azcapotzalco neighborhood.

== Gameplay ==
Ulama games are played on a temporary court called a tastei ([tas.te], from tlachtli [ˈt͡ɬat͡ʃt͡ɬi], the Nahuatl word meaning "ballcourt"). The bounds of these long narrow courts are made by drawing or chalking thick lines in the dirt. The courts are divided into opposing sides by a center line, called an analco. A ball that is allowed to cross the end line, the chichi or chivo, will result in a point scored for the opposing team. Points or rayas ("lines", so named for the tally marks used to keep score) are gained in play. The scoring system provides for resetting the score to zero under certain conditions, which can make for lengthy games.

The modern-day game has three main forms:

- Ulama de cadera or hip ulama. A hip ulama team consists of five or more players (but there could be as many as twelve) wearing loincloths, with leather hip pads for some protection against the heavy (3–4 kg, around 7–9 lb) rubber ball.
- Ulama de antebrazo or forearm ulama. Played on a smaller field, with teams of one to three players and a ball lighter than that of hip ulama, the games require the players to return the ball using their wrapped forearm. Women often play this game.
- Ulama de mazo or Ulamad de palo, in which a heavy (6–7 kg or 13–15 lb) two-handed wooden paddle strikes a 500g (1 lb) ball, usually in teams of three or four.

The object of the game is to keep the ball in play and in-bounds. Depending on the score and the local variant of the rules, the ball is played either high or low. A team scores a point when a player of the opposing team hits the ball out of turn, misses the ball, knocks the ball out of bounds, touches the ball with any part of the body aside from the hip, accidentally touches a teammate, lets the ball stop moving before it reaches the center line, or even if they fail to announce the score after they have scored a point.

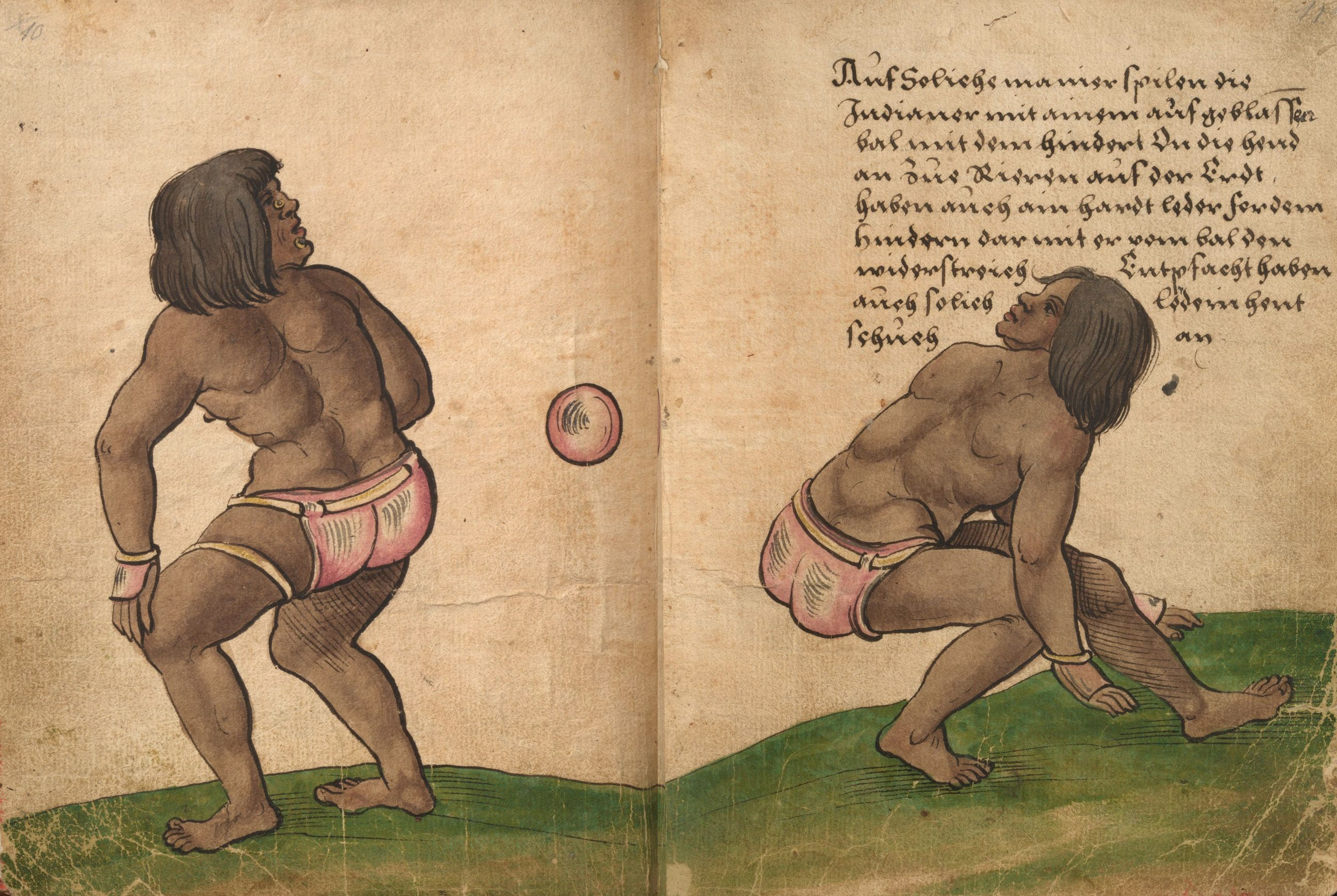
Aztec ullamaliztli players performing for Charles V in Spain, drawn by Christoph Weiditz in 1528. Note the similarity in dress to the modern-day ulama player above.

== Ulama balls ==
See also Mesoamerican rubber balls

== Sports governance ==
=== Associations ===
In Mexico and the United States, ulama de cadera is governed by Asociación de Juego de Pelota Mesoamericano (Mesoamerican Ballgame Association) or AJUPEME, which is a non-profit ulama sports association founded by Armando Uscanga and Reyna Puc. The organization has two branches in each of the respective countries: AJUPEME Mexico and AJUPEME USA.

In Belize, ulama de cadera is governed by the Belize Hipball Association.

=== International tournaments ===
The Pok-Ta-Pok World Cup began in 2015, in Chichen Itza, Mexico. The tournament is organized by the Central American and Caribbean Ancestral Mayan Ballgame Association (ACCDAPM).

Pok-ta-Pok World Cup/Mesoamerican Ball Game Championship
Year	Host	Men's Gold	Men's Silver	Men's Bronze	Women's Gold	Women's Silver	Women's Bronze
2015	Chichen Itza (Pisté), Yucatán, Mexico	Mexico	Guatemala	Belize	N/A	N/A	N/A
2017	Guatemala City, Guatemala	Belize	Guatemala	N/A	N/A	N/A	N/A
2018	Orange Walk Town, Belize	Mexico	Belize	Guatemala	N/A	N/A	N/A
2019	San Salvador, El Salvador	Belize	Mexico	USA	N/A	N/A	N/A
2021	Orange Walk Town, Belize	Belize	Mexico	Guatemala	N/A	N/A	N/A
2022	Xcaret (Playa del Carmen), QROO, Mexico	Belize	Mexico	USA	N/A	N/A	N/A
2023	Orange Walk Town, Belize	Mexico	Belize	Guatemala	Guatemala	El Salvador	Belize

== See also ==
- Batey (game)
- Pelota purépecha
