= Tlaloc II-TC =

Tlaloc II - TC, also known as the Tlaloc II Robot, is a robot especially designed for the exploration of the tunnel discovered in 2003 under the Temple of the Feathered Serpent at Teotihuacan, a pre-Columbian site founded in the second century BC in central Mexico.

The robot was designed by the INAH for the project called “Proyecto Tlalocan, Camino bajo la tierra”. Tlaloc II-TC is a successor of the first robot design for archaeological exploration called Tlaloc I which brought to light the first images of the tunnel in 2010.

Tlaloc II-TC weighed 35 kg and discovered three previously unknown chambers in 2013. Its designer, Ng Tze Chuen, was previously involved with developing the Djedi robot that was used to explore small tunnels in the Pyramids in Egypt.
