= Pelota mixteca =

Mexican team sport

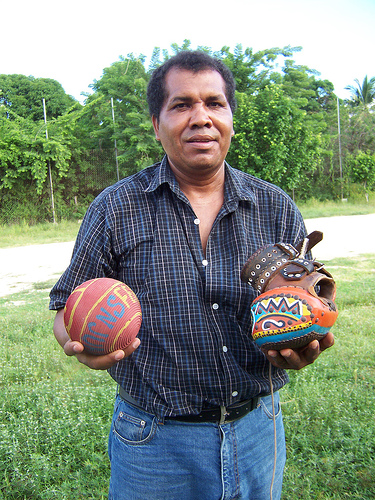
A pelota mixteca player with rubber ball and glove. The striking surface of the glove (facing down in this photo) is studded with nails driven into the glove

Pelota mixteca ("Mixtec-style ball") is a team sport similar to a net-less tennis game. The players wear sturdy, elaborately decorated gloves affixed to a heavy flat striking surface, using them to strike a small solid ball. The game has roots extending back hundreds, or perhaps thousands, of years.

Today, the game is played in the Mexican state of Oaxaca and Guerrero and in emigrant communities including those in the Mexico City, Los Angeles and Fresno areas.

The members of each five-player team take their positions on one-half of a long narrow court—roughly 100 m long by 11 m wide—which has been measured out on compacted soil. To serve, the ball is first bounced on a flat stone, and then struck on the rebound. The complex scoring system is similar to tennis.

== Gloves, balls, and variations ==
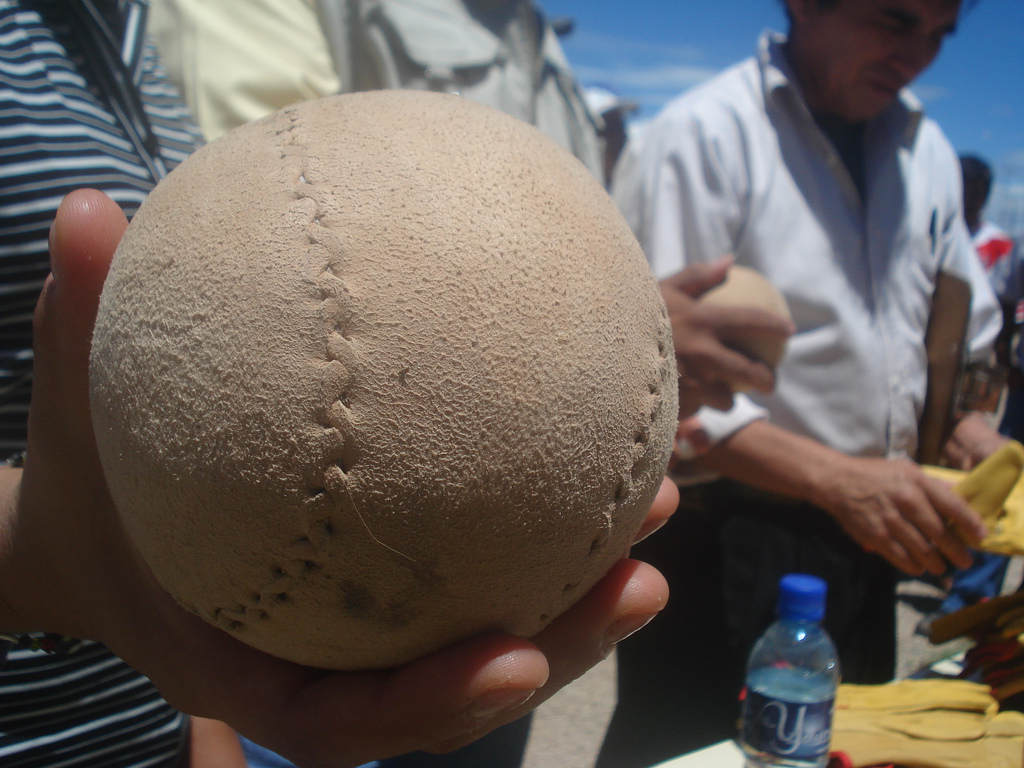
A deerskin-lined pelota mixteca de forro ball

The large gloves, which are usually studded with nails, weigh between 3–6 kg (7–12 lbs). Although the ball was traditionally made of wool, a wide variety of materials are used today:

- The most commonly played game uses a ball made of rubber rolled with stocking thread, and fitted with a suede outer lining. The resultant ball weighs about 300–330 grams (12 oz) and measures 8–10 cm (3–4 in) in diameter (see photo on left). To differentiate it from other versions, this game is sometimes referred to as pelota mixteca de forro ("Mixtec-style lined ball").
- A version named pelota mixteca de hule ("Mixtec-style rubber ball") uses a heavier, 900 gram rubber ball, with no outer lining, often painted in bright colors (see photo above).
- A version of the game played in the Los Angeles area uses a plastic ball weighing 1–1½ kg.
- The little-known pelota mixteca del valle uses a very light (less than 100 gram) sponge ball which is struck with a wooden paddle strapped to the hand.

The game is claimed by many writers to be a descendant of the 3000+ year old Mesoamerican ballgame, perhaps the particular version shown on reliefs at the Mixtec archaeological site of Dainzu. Heiner Gillmeister, on the other hand, has argued that pelota mixteca may instead be descended from a Franco-Flemish ancestor of real tennis, likely through intermediate games similar to the Basque pelota or Valencian pilota, and from there brought to New Spain and this would put the game's roots back 412 years ago.
