= Tōryanse =

Traditional Japanese song

Tōryanse played at a crosswalk

"Tōryanse" (通りゃんせ) is the name of a traditional Japanese children's tune (warabe uta). It is a common choice for music played by traffic lights in Japan when it is safe to cross. Tōryanse can be heard in many forms of popular culture, such as at crosswalks in anime.

== Lyrics ==
The words to the song are:

Japanese:	Romaji:	Translation:
通りゃんせ 通りゃんせ ここはどこの 細道じゃ	Tōryanse, tōryanse Koko wa doko no hosomichi ja?	You may go in, you may enter Whose narrow path is this?
天神さまの 細道じゃ ちっと通して 下しゃんせ	Tenjin-sama no hosomichi ja Chitto tōshite kudashanse	This is the narrow pathway of the Tenjin shrine Please allow me to go through
御用のないもの 通しゃせぬ この子の七つの 御祝いに 御札を納めに 参ります	Goyō no nai mono tōshasenu Kono ko no nanatsu no oiwai ni Ofuda wo osame ni mairimasu	Those without good reason shall not pass To celebrate the 7th birthday of this child We've come to dedicate our offering [to offer our ofuda here]
行きはよいよい 帰りはこわい	Iki wa yoi yoi, kaeri wa kowai	Going in is easy, but returning is scary
こわいながらも 通りゃんせ 通りゃんせ	Kowai nagara mo Tōryanse, tōryanse	It's scary, but You may go in, You may pass through

== Explanation ==
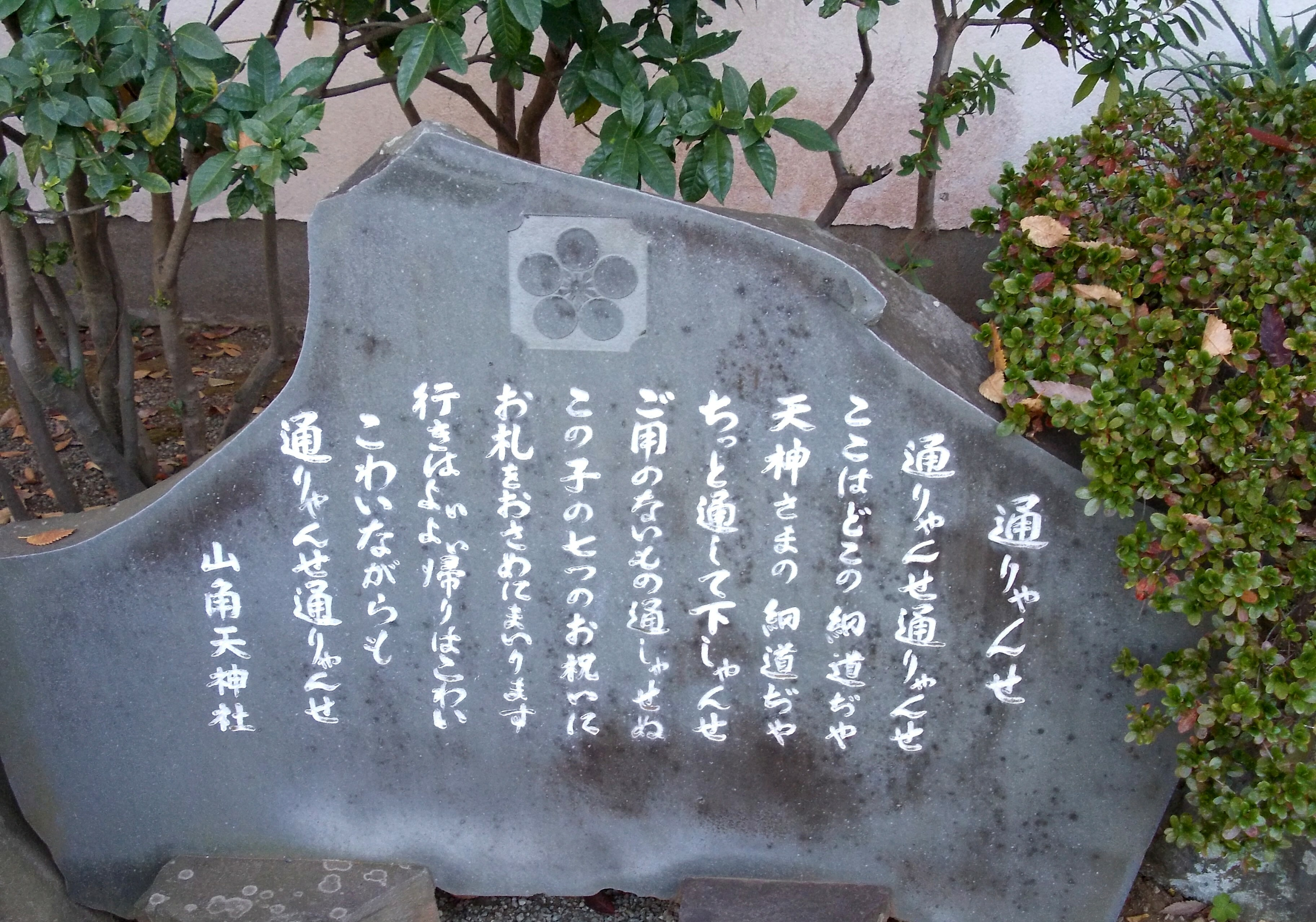
The Monument of Tōryanse in Yamakaku Shrine

There are many theories to the origin of the song, but all agree that it is a portrayal of an exchange between a civilian and a guard manning some sort of a checkpoint – at Kawagoe Castle according to one theory. In the old days when infant mortality was high, people celebrated when a child survived to reach the age of 7 (as well as 3 and 5; see Shichi-Go-San), and ordinary people were only allowed to visit the shrine within the castle compound for special occasions.

This particular warabe uta is sung as part of a traditional game where two children facing each other link their hands to form an arch 'checkpoint', and the remaining children walk through underneath in a line (and back round again in circles). The child who happens to be under the arch when the song finishes is then 'caught', not unlike the Anglophone game "London Bridge Is Falling Down".

The tune being played at Japanese pedestrian crossings is an analogy to this game, i.e., it is safe to cross until the music stops.

== See also ==
- Warabe uta
- Kagome Kagome
