= Mesoamerican rubber balls =

Balls used in Mesoamerican ball games

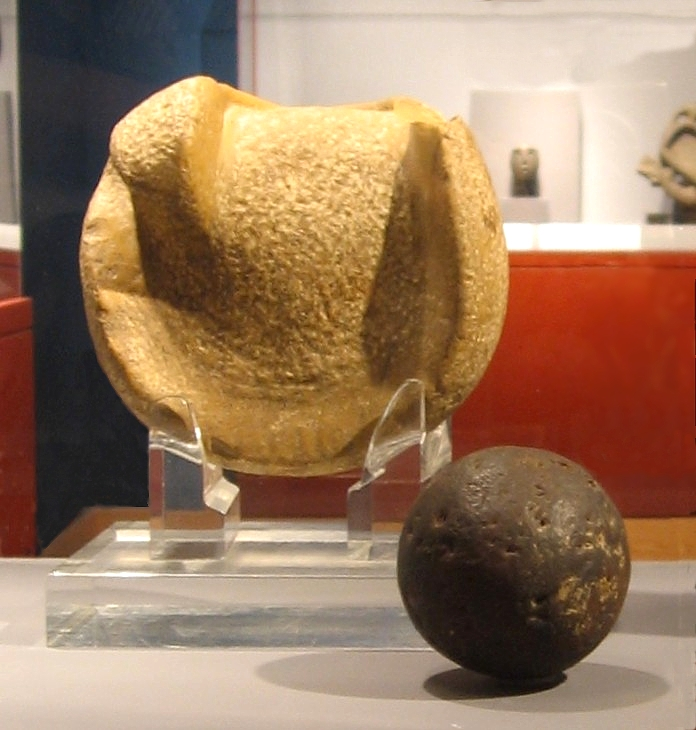
A solid rubber ball used (or similar to those used) in the Mesoamerican ballgame, 300 BCE to 250 CE, Kaminaljuyu. The ball is 3 inches (almost 8 cm) in diameter, a size that suggests it was used to play a handball game. Behind the ball is a manopla, or handstone, which was used to strike the ball, 900 BCE to 250 CE, also from Kaminaljuyu.

Ancient Mesoamericans were the first people to invent rubber balls (Nahuatl languages: ōllamaloni), sometime before 1600 BCE, and used them in a variety of roles. The Mesoamerican ballgame, for example, employed various sizes of solid rubber balls and balls were burned as offerings in temples, buried in votive deposits, and laid in sacred bogs and cenotes.

== Rubber in Mesoamerica ==
Ancient rubber was made from latex of the rubber tree (Castilla elastica), which is indigenous to the tropical areas of southern Mexico and Central America. The latex was made into rubber by mixing it with the juice of what was likely Ipomoea alba (a species of morning glory), a process which preceded Goodyear's vulcanization by several millennia. The resultant rubber would then be formed into rubber strips, which would be wound around a solid rubber core to build the ball.

Archaeological evidence indicates that rubber was already in use in Mesoamerica by the Early Formative Period – a dozen balls were found in the Olmec El Manati sacrificial bog and dated to roughly 1600 BCE. By the time of the Spanish Conquest, 3000 years later, rubber was being exported from the tropical zones to sites all over Mesoamerica.

Iconography suggests that although there were many uses for rubber, rubber balls both for offerings and for ritual ballgames were the primary products. To both the Aztecs and the Maya, the rubber latex that flowed from the tree represented blood and semen. Rubber was therefore symbolic of fertility, and was often burned, buried, or (fortunately for archaeology) laid in a sacrificial pool as an offering to various deities.

== Size and weight ==
The exact sizes or weights of the balls actually used in the ballgame are not known. Sizes varied not only according to the ballgame version played (i.e. hip-ball, handball, stick-ball, etc.), but even within a given version. For example, Late Classic hip-ball stone scoring rings had holes of differing sizes, strongly implying that the balls were not of uniform size either.

Most of the ancient balls that have been retrieved were originally laid down as offerings, and there is no evidence that any of these were used in the ballgame. In fact, some of these extant votive balls were created specifically as offerings. However, ancient iconography as well as modern game balls can provide insight. For example, archaeologist Laura Filloy Nadal compiled the following comparison of modern ball sizes:

Ballgame Version	Ball struck with	Ball diameter	Ball weight
Ulama de cadera	Hip	≤20 cm (7.9 in)	3–4 kilograms (6.6–8.8 lb)
Ulama de mazo	Heavy bat, 5–7 kg	Unavailable	500–600 g (18–21 oz)
Ulama de brazo	Forearm	≈11 cm (4 1/2 in)	≤500 g (16-18 oz)
Pelota mixteca	Heavy glove	8–10 cm (3.1–3.9 in)	170–280 g (6.0–9.9 oz)

It is therefore assumed by most researchers that the ancient hip-ball was roughly the size of a volleyball and weighed between 3–4 kilograms (6.6–8.8 lb) or 15 times heavier than the air-filled volleyball. The ancient handball or stick-ball was probably slightly larger and heavier than a modern-day baseball.
Only roughly 100 pre-Columbian rubber artifacts have been recovered, all of which were found in still, freshwater contexts, sites that include El Manati, the Sacred Cenote at Chichen Itza, and the ruins of Tenochtitlan.

The following table summarizes data on some of the ancient balls recovered:

Location	Culture	# found	Ball diameter	Period
El Manati	Olmec	5	10–14 cm	1600–1700 BCE
El Manati	Olmec	2	22 cm	1200 BCE
Sacred Cenote	Maya	Unknown	4 cm	850–1550 CE
Main ballcourt, Tenochtitlan	Aztec	2	7 cm	Early 16th century?
House of Eagles, Tenochtitlan	Aztec	4	6–8½ cm	Early 16th century?

== Oversized balls, skull-balls, and captive-balls ==
Although there is no artifact evidence uncovered to support such speculation, depictions of overly large balls or balls which appear to contain skulls and even captives have created much conjecture.

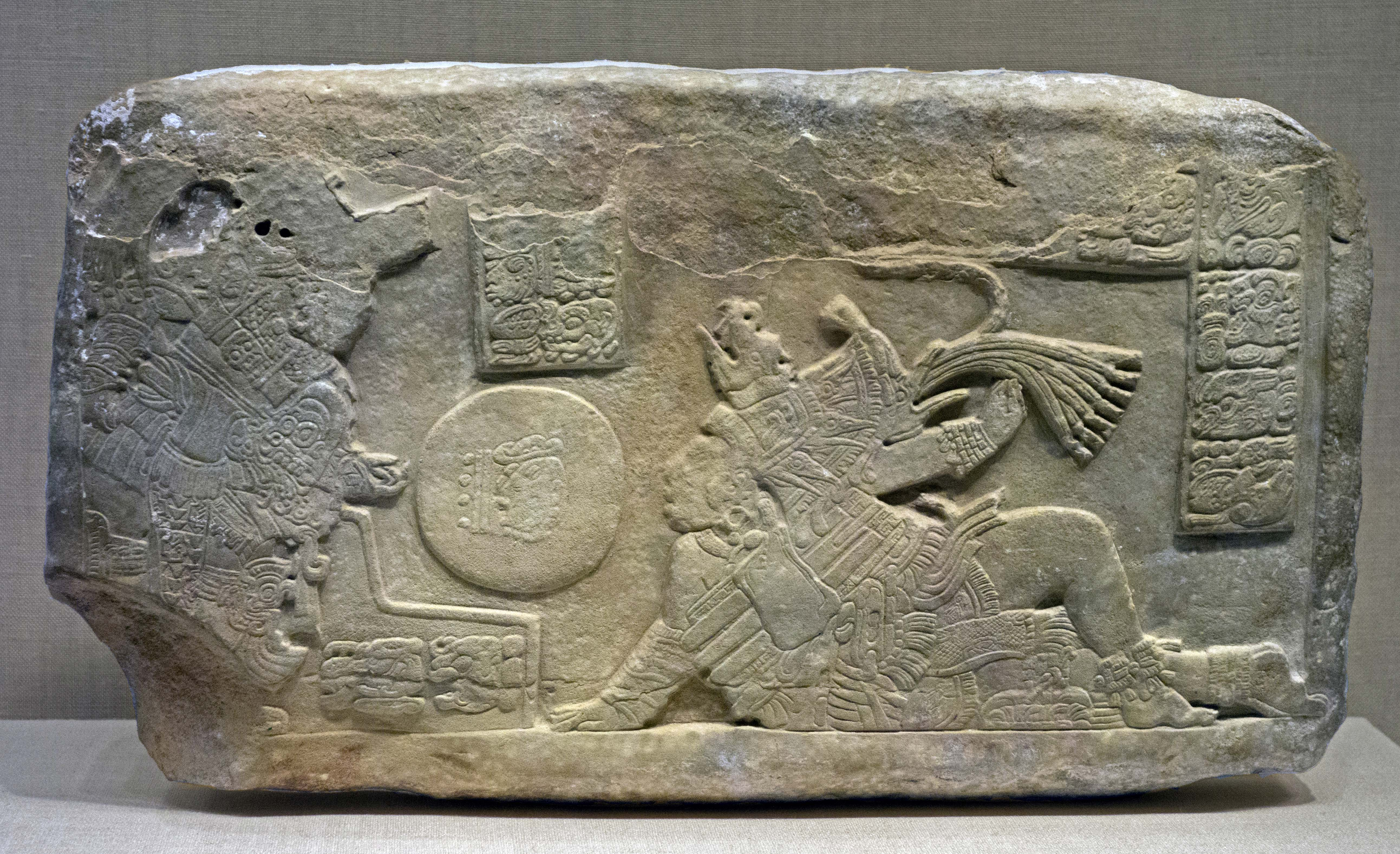
A Maya limestone staircase riser, ca. 700 - 900 CE. Against the backdrop of a staircase, two nobles play the ballgame with an overly large, perhaps symbolic, ball. The ball itself contains two glyphs, a "14" and an unknown glyph that has been speculatively translated as "handspan". Height: 25.1 cm; length: 43.2 cm.

Many depictions of ballplayers show balls of huge size, perhaps up to 1 metre (1.1 yd) or more in diameter. These depictions include not only the image on the right, but the "Dallas vase", the Chinkultic court marker, and a Western Mexico ceramic ballcourt. Most researchers believe that these depictions are exaggerations, in large part because a solid ball one meter in diameter would be nearly too heavy to move, weighing close to 500 kg (over 1000 lbs). Researcher Marvin Cohodas has suggested that these depictions are either symbolic, or that the outsized ball and outlandish costumes might portray "a few heavily costumed nobles [taking] perfunctory shots at an oversize ball ... perhaps re-enacting a cosmogonic myth".

Nonetheless, Marc Zender of the Peabody Museum has interpreted a common ball-glyph (seen for example on the ball at right) as "handspan", a circumference measurement of roughly 8 1/2 inches (22 cm). Combined with coefficients of 9, 10, 12, 13, and 14, Zender contends that "Classic Maya ballgame balls would have measured from just over two feet to well over three feet in diameter (62 to 96 cm)".

The images of skulls superimposed on balls found at the Great Ballcourt at Chichen Itza and on several Maya artifacts, have led several researchers to suggest that skulls of the sacrificial victims were wrapped with rubber to create hollow balls. Other than these images, however, there is no evidence to support such an assertion.

On Altar 8 at Tikal as well as on the Hieroglyphic Stairs at Yaxchilan, captives appear to be inside, or are at least superimposed upon, balls. Like those of oversized and skull-balls, most researchers doubt that such images are to be taken literally. Schele and Miller, for example, state that the captive is "bound and trussed in the form of a ball".

== Notes ==
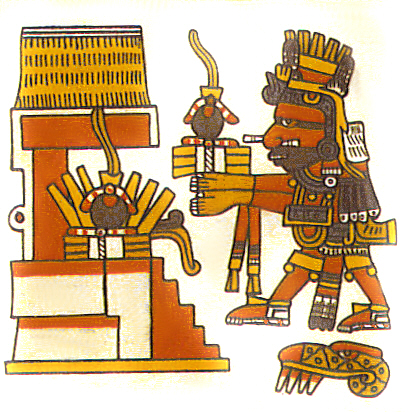
In this detail from the late 15th century Codex Borgia, the Aztec god Xiuhtecuhtli brings a rubber ball offering to a temple. The rubber balls each hold a quetzal feather, part of the offering.
