= Pelota purépecha =

Indigenous Mexican sport

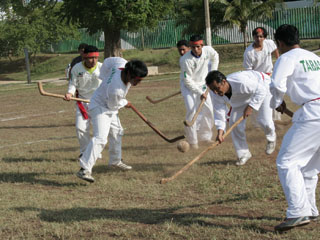
The version of pelota purépecha in play without a flaming ball

Pelota purépecha (Spanish for "Purépecha ball"), called Uárukua Ch'anakua ( "a game with sticks") in the Purépecha language, is an Indigenous Mexican sport similar to those in the hockey family. A common variant, distinguished as pasárutakua in Purépecha, uses a ball which has been set on fire and can be played at night. It has a league, several practicing communities and about 800 players across Mexico as of 2010. It is one of 150 pre-Hispanic Mexican games at risk of dying out along with Ulama.

== Origin ==
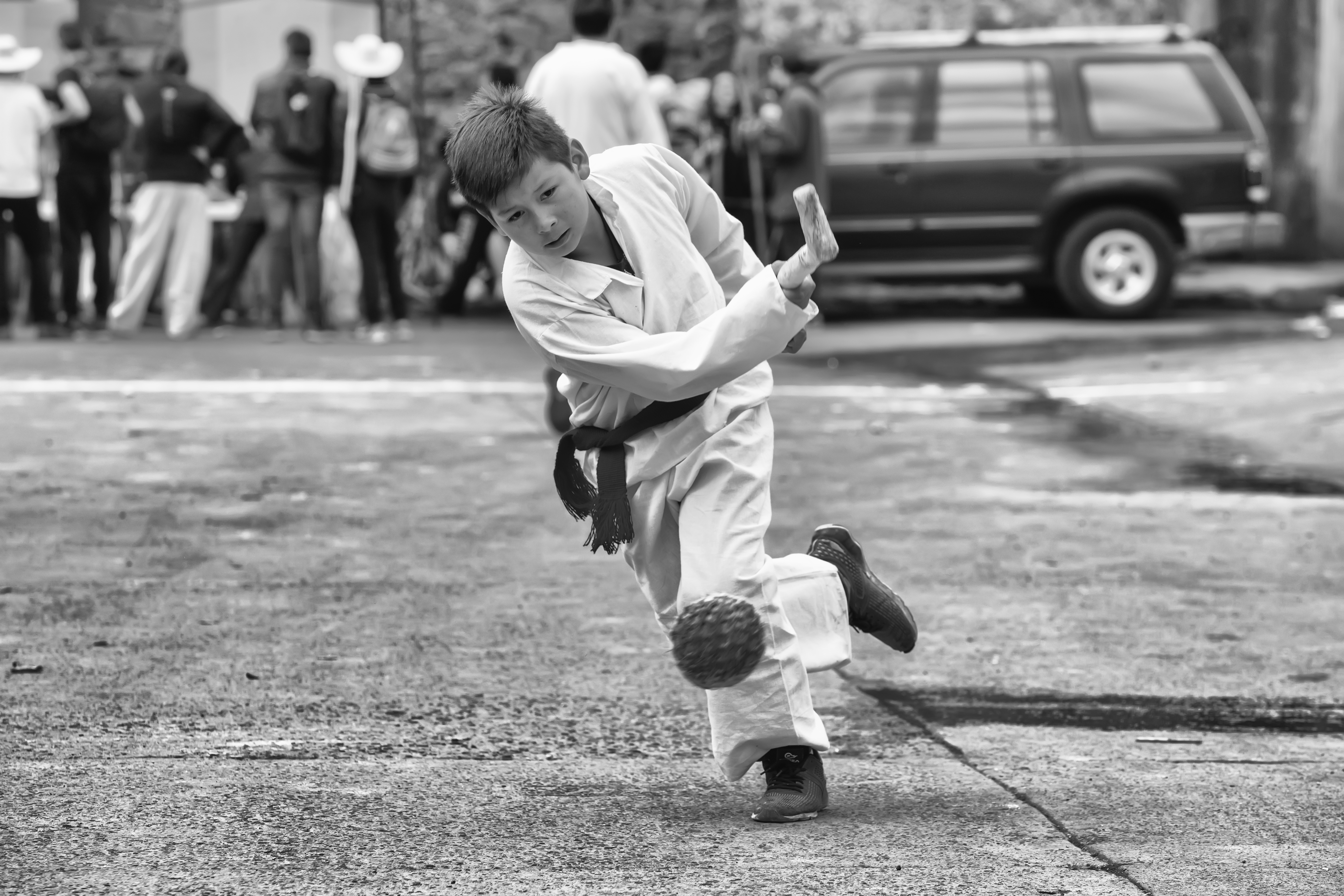
The game commemorates the birth of the sun and at the same time, it was created with the intention of achieving the balance of the cosmos.

The game, which originated in Michoacán, is believed to have been developed up to 3500 years ago and something very similar to pelota purépecha is depicted on the murals of the Palacio de Tepantitla at Teotihuacan. The sport originated as a representation of a Purepécha legend of a battle between day and night with the flaming ball signifying the sun and the players representing the movement of the universe.

== Equipment and Rules ==
The game is played with five or more players per side.

=== Field ===
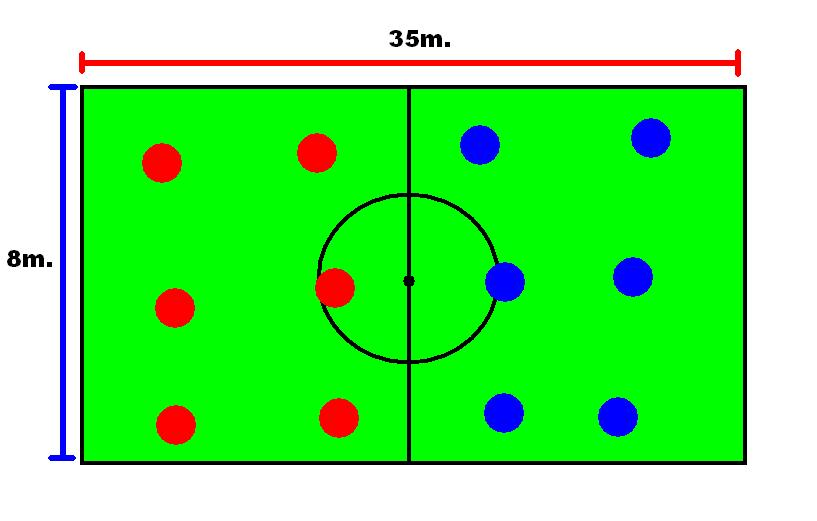
Modern pelota purépecha field

Traditionally the game is played around a block of houses or along four streets, about 6─8 metres wide and 150─200 metres long. The game has since been adapted to be played in parks. The surfaces are very diverse and they have included snow, such as played by Latin students at Cornell University.

=== Ball ===
A pelota purépecha has a diameter of 12─14 cm. Balls not intended to be set on fire were originally made from hundreds of monarch butterfly cocoons but are now made from natural fabrics. The fireball version is made from wood and used to be dipped in pine resin to be made flammable though today petrol is substituted.
