= Tecpatl =

Symbol from Aztec mythology

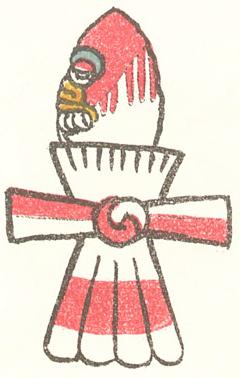
Técpatl (18th day sign of the Aztec calendar) (Image from the Codex Magliabechiano)

In the Aztec culture, a tecpatl was a flint or obsidian knife with a lanceolate figure and double-edged blade, with elongated ends. Both ends could be rounded or pointed, but other designs were made with a blade attached to a handle. It can be represented with the top half red, reminiscent of the color of blood, in representations of human sacrifice and the rest white, indicating the color of the flint blade.

It was the sign of the eighteenth day, the twentieth day of the month of the Aztec calendar and the beginning of one of the twenty trecenas of the tonalpohualli.

The Tecpatl knife was traditionally used for human sacrifice by the Aztecs, but it also was the short-range weapon of the jaguar warriors. Although it may have seen only limited use on the battlefield, its sharp edges would have made it an effective sidearm.

== Mythical origin of Tecpatl ==
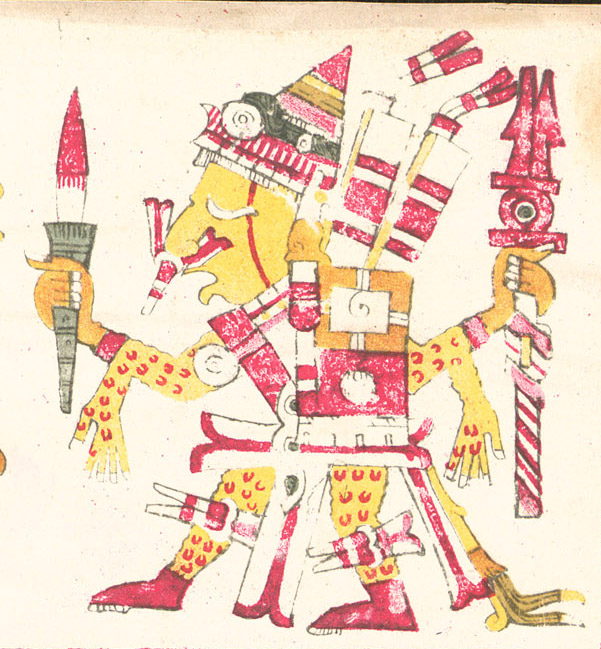
Xipe Totec, carrying a bloody tecpatl. (Codex Borgia)

Tecpatl, is one of the most complex iconographic symbols of Aztec mythology. This knife expresses multiple meanings that carry a complex view of the world which are closely associated with the notions of origin and human sacrifice.

The Tecpatl was born in the height of heaven shaped as a knife, and was thrown down by his brother, and it was destined to descend from heaven to Earth. It falls in Chicomoztoc (The Place of the Seven Caves) primary array of peoples, fragmenting into 1600 pieces, and from those fragments a thousand and six hundred gods emerge, the first gods on Earth. These gods emerging from the Seven Caves are the Centzonmimixcoa (four hundred cloud snakes, or “countless cloud snakes” - in Nāhuatl, 400 is used to express being countless). This is confirmed by another version of the myth where the Flint serves as a temporary event marker, appearing as a calendar date, as a carrier of the year Centzonmimixcoa are born: "In year 1 Tecpatl Centzonmimixcoa were born, Iztac Chalchiuhtlicue (She of the Jade Skirt) begat the fourhundreth mixcohua. Then they went into a cave; and upon entering, their mother gave birth to five more Mimixcoa".

In the version of the Legend of the Five Suns, Tecpatl becomes temporal marker of the birth of the Centzonmimixcoa, and the name of the mother goddess switches to Iztac Chalchiuhtlicue(She of the Jade Skirt).

According to Bernardino de Sahagún and Diego Durán they present the homology between this myth and ritual. "Among the ornaments worn by the women representing Cihuacoatl at parties, they also brought a crib on their back, so to bring your child in it, and stood in the tianguis among the other women, and disappearing left the crib there. When the other women looked at what was in it, it was a flint and iron were sandeel, with which they killed those whom they sacrificed." Meanwhile, Duran tells his priests" sought a child cot and put into it a flint knife with which they sacrificed the one they called the son of Cihuacoatl."

In the version where the Centzonmimixcoa are born from the Tecpatl, the mother's name is Citlalinicue. In the version that is temporary marker Tecpatl birth, the mother is Iztac Chalchiuhtlicue, and in rites the mother of Tecpatl is Cihuacoatl. Three different invocations of the primordial mothers: skirt stars, She of the Jade Skirt, the snake woman who is at once a warrior deity, Tecpatl mother of the fourhundreth Centonmimixcoa born, the first gods on earth, in Chicomoztoc, the womb of the peoples.

== Tecpatl in Aztec mythology ==
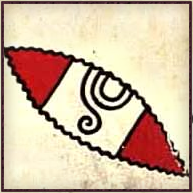
Tecpatl (sacrificial knife), image based on the Codex Borgia

In Aztec mythology, the tecpatl was sometimes drawn as a simple flint blade, sharpened with some notches on the edge, in the Codex Borgia it appears red.

Tecpatl was associated with Northern cardinal point (Mictlan)., the dark place of eternal stillness and rest of the dead.

The ancient Anahuac, considered the Tecpatl as a symbol of Xiuhtecuhtli tletl (fire protector of the grass or fire protector of the year), being the oldest method to produce sparks(and fire) by colliding two flints. It also relates to Ehecatl, since in the codices it's represented by high winds, meaning that the air cuts like razor, so it represented xopantla ( spring ), the time of high winds. According to Diego Durán, the former Anahuac considered the tecpatl as the worst sign of the zodiac, because the men and women born under this sign were happy but prone to infertility.

== Tecpatl as calendrical symbol ==
The image of the tecpatl was a lunar symbol and therefore ruled agricultural events. Their patron gods were: Chalchiuhtotolin and Tezcatlipoca.

In the trecena of Ce Tecpatl(One Flint), the gods were Tōnatiuh and Mictlantecuhtli. On day Ce Tecpatl(One Flint), there was a festival dedicated to Huitzilopochtli, patron god of Tenochtitlan.

Tecpatl Year 1 (1168): the Aztec people left their place of origin, Aztlán, to undertake a long and difficult journey through the arid northern lands, part of what is now known as Mexico City.

== Tecpatl as a tool for human sacrifice ==
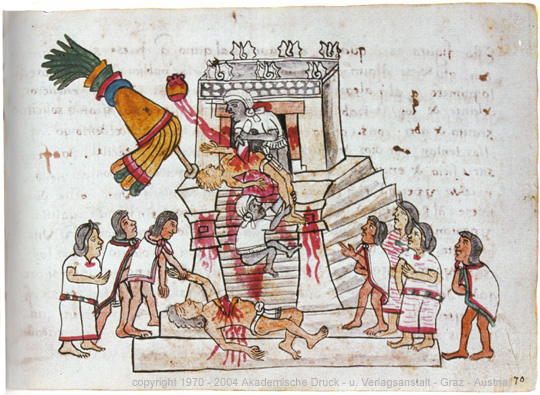
Sacrifice of a war captive (Image based on the Codex Magliabechiano)

The tecpatl or sacrificial knife, was an important element in Aztec rituals. The tecpatl was used by Aztec priests to open the chest of the victims of human sacrifice to extract the heart that would feed the gods, in the hope that the offerings would bring blessings to mankind. The most widespread sacrificial procedure among Aztecs, was removal of the heart.

There were different types of knives, some of them allude to human sacrifice, being carved as a skull silhouette, where the nose was used as the cutting edge of the weapon.

In the few técpame that have survived, there are some representations of deities in their handles. A famous pre-Columbian example is the carved image of a figure using circular plugs in its ears and a big bow ornament made out of feathers, which associates this figure with Tōnatiuh, the sun god. Tōnatiuh's arms appears to be holding the knife's blade. This particular knife, emphasizes the importance of human sacrifices to feed the gods, especially the sun god, who illuminates the earth and sustains life.

== Tecpatl in the Sunstone ==
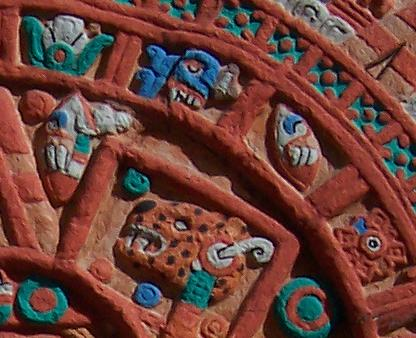
Representations of the tecpatl in the sun stone

The flint knife, is also represented in the following sections of the Sun Stone:

1. The tongue of the central face representing Tōnatiuh.
2. The date Ce Tecpatl (one flint), sculpted between the central solar ray and the image of Nahui Ocelotl(4 Jaguar). Here the flint carries a glyph of Tezcatlipoca.
3. The glyph Tecpatl, carved within the circle of twenty days.
4. The tongues sticking out of the anthropomorphic faces in profile emerging from the jaws of the two xiuhcoatl in the outer ring of the monument.
5. On the outside edge of the stone, alternating with star glyphs. Each of the latter also uses the tecpatl to represent rays of light (or fire) emitted by the stars.
6. On the Xihuitzolli (the royal diadem), sculpted between the central solar ray and the image of Nahui Ehecatl (4 Wind) quad. The center of the headband has a very similar shape to the knife that can be seen on other representations of the monument, and the tecpatl is commonly found in other representations of this device.

== Nahui Ollin and Tecpatl ==
In the accounts written by Fray Gerónimo de Mendieta on the origin of Tecpatl: The Centzonmimixcoa were the first man-gods, "they shall be as gods who created mankind and subsequently be slaughtered at Teotihuacan, some by jumping into fire, the others by opening their chest with a flint knife, this in order that the new Sun has movement and life".

This story is related to two main iconographic elements from Sunstone: one is the Flint Knife (Tecpatl), and the other is the glyph: Four Movement (Nahui Ollin)

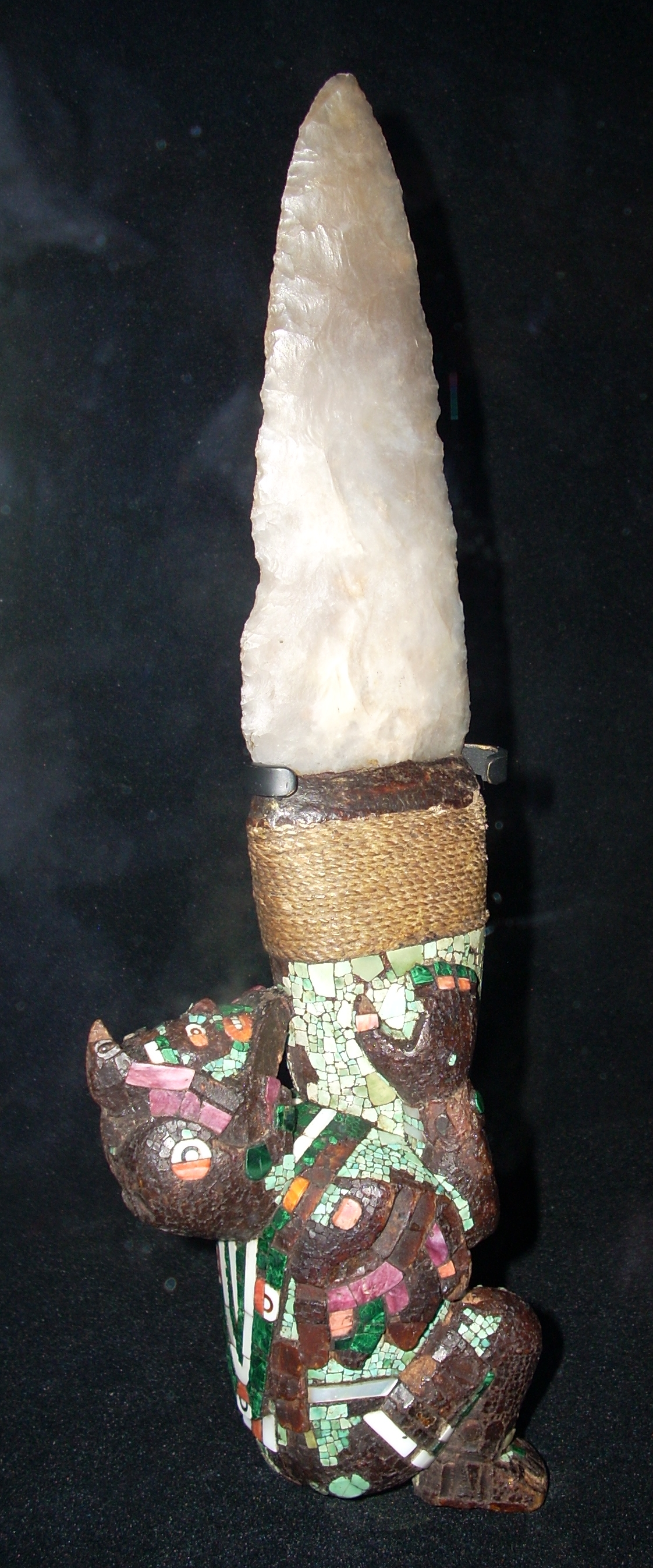
Aztec or Mixtec sacrificial knife, probably for ceremonial use only, in the British Museum.

== Tecpatl and Mixcoatl – Tezcatlipoca ==
In the version of the Legend of the Five Suns, as well as the fourhundreth, five more Centzonmimixcoa are born. The Sun god (Tōnatiuh) sends these five Centzonmimixcoa to destroy their older siblings, but they do not offer any of their kill to the Sun god, or the Earth Lord(Tlaltecuhtli) . Among these five is Mixcoatl, who after destroying the fourhundreth Mimixcoa is given a white flint that came gushing out of Itzpapalotl's body. It was burned (dedicated to Itzpapalotl) and broken several times. From there first came the azure flint; the second time flowed white flint. They took the white and wrapped it in a blanket. The third time sprouted yellow flint; neither took only saw. The fourth time flowed red flint; neither took. The fifth time sprang the black flint; neither took. Mixcoatl worshiped the gods by offering the white flint, which he wrapped in another blanket; and carried it on his back and went to fight in the place named Comallan, carrying it as an offering to his god, Itzpapalotl.

In Aztec codices, the myth goes that Tezcatlipoca changed his name to Mixcoatl in the second year after the flood and makes fire from two pieces of flint. Which would explain the reason why, in the Sun Stone, the Tecpatl is carrying the glyph of Tezcatlipoca. The Tecpatl, linked to the origin of the fire, is also identified as a symbol of the Sun and stars.

== Tecpatl associated with the Moon ==
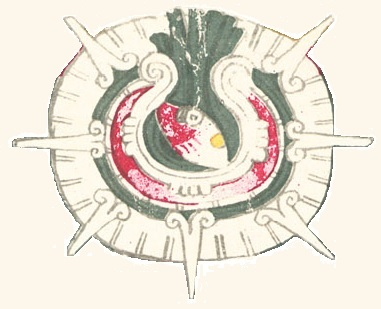
Técpatl represented on the Moon Codex Borgia page 18.

In the codices, the Moon is usually shown on a framework of dark night, as a kind of vessel cross-cut and usually filled with a liquid form. The vessel appears to be formed by a crooked bone, and inside is almost always the figure of a rabbit, a tecpatl or sometimes a small snail. Sometimes the Moon is represented in the same way as the Sun, with rays, but with different colors and with a snail or tecpatl in the center.

In the Codex Borgia, the flint knife is imposed inside the lunar glyph replacing the rabbit. This substitution, undoubtedly refers to the relationship between the Moon and death. The Legend of the Five Suns, the name of the moon god is Nahui be Tecpatl (Four-Flint knife).

== Anthropomorphizing Tecpatl ==
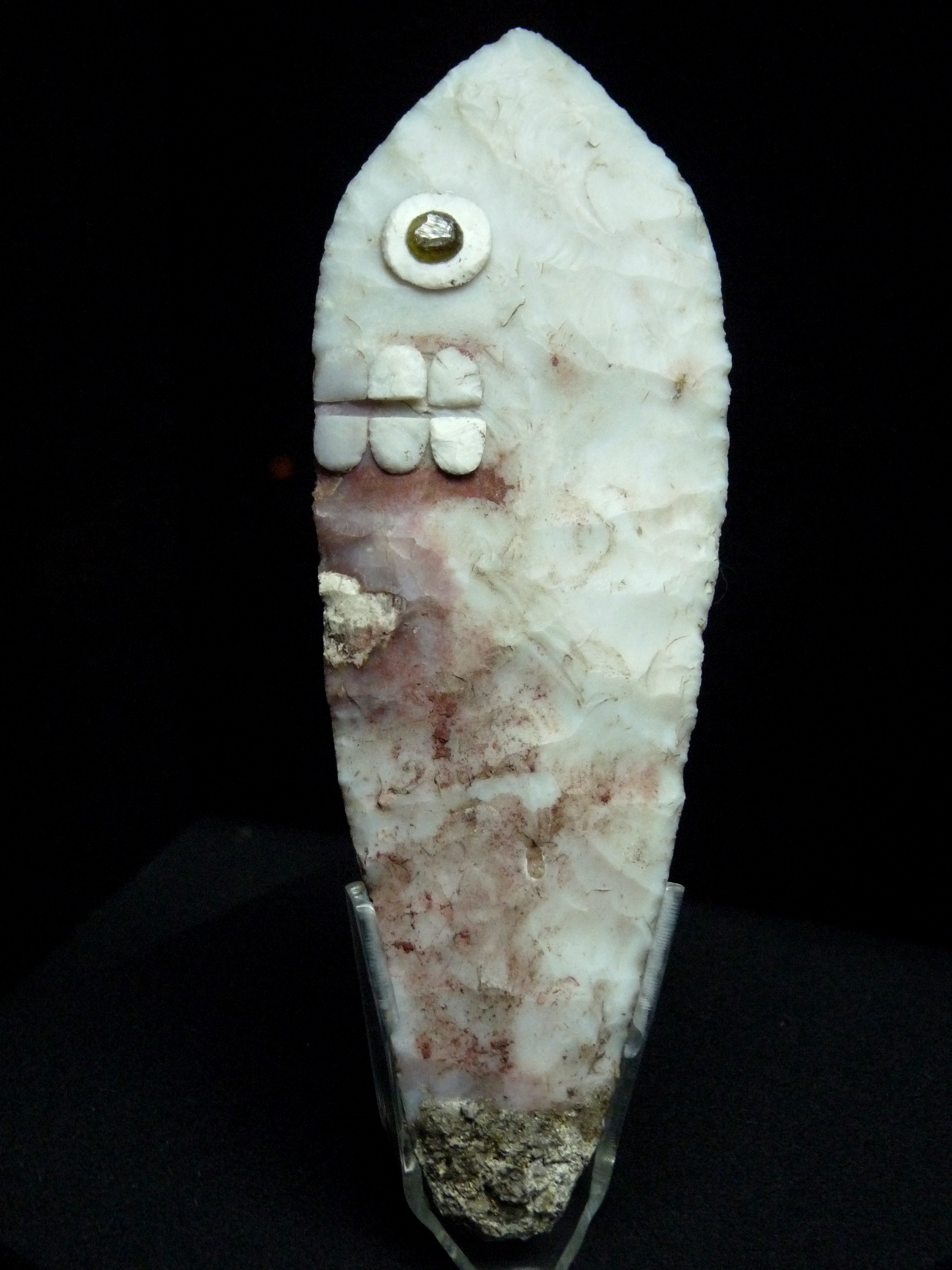
Aztec sacrificial knife made out of flint, exhibit from Museo del Templo Mayor, in Mexico City.

In other more elaborate representations in addition to the basic form, the tecpatl can appear anthropomorphized, with two to seven teeth and an eye in the central region, which has a pupil center and an eyebrow on top; this eye is similar to that shown in the image of mizquitli (death). Other times it was built into an elaborate handle made of wood or stone inlaid with turquoise and shell.

Other times, the flint was represented deified bristling with teeth or fangs and jaws with one eye.

A knife found in the Templo Mayor of Tenochtitlan, shows a profile of a face that presumably represents the carrier of the tecpatl year(a minor deity). Its teeth and eyes were accented with inlaid white flint and obsidian, a volcanic rock. As it is a sacred sacrificial knife it is symbolically related to Mictlan, the lower part of the universe where the emaciated beings live. Mictlan was associated with the color black and the tecpatl (sacrificial knife). This knife is associated with the black god Tezcatlipoca, who embodies an obsidian knife representing the black wind. As sacrificial knife, it is also associated with the North (the direction of death) and the flayed god Xipe Totec.

== Tecpatl represented as tongue or nose ==
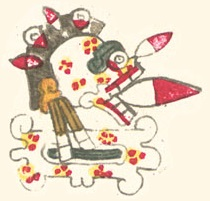
Mictlantecuhtli with tecpame representing his nose and tongue (Codex Borgia, page 18).

The knife inserted into the nasal cavity symbolizes "cut the air", which is a vital element in symbolizing death. The tongue in the form of an obsidian knife (tecpatl) exposed to outside, indicates the need to be fed with the magical substance that was human blood flowing from the heart.

In excavations of the Templo Mayor, 33 skull-masks representing Mictlantecuhtli (god of death) were found; made out of the rostral portion of human skulls, adorned with shell and pyrite to represent the eyes, and sacrificial knives to simulate nose and tongue.

In the Codex Borbonicus, Xolotl's tongue is made out of flint and he is carrying another knife with his right hand. Tlaltecuhtli (Lord of the Earth), is found in various sculptures and manuscripts, with tecpatl representing the tongue of the deity. In the Sun Stone, the tongue of the central face of Tōnatiuh is a tecpatl. In the Codex Borgia, Mictlantecuhtli (lord of the underworld) appears as an active sacrificer armed with an ax or a técpal, ready to draw the hearts of his victims, his nose and tongue accuse the form of sharp knives.

== Tecpatl in Mexica worldview ==
The Tecpatl was in the middle of Aztec mythology, it is in the center of the Sun Stone, and it was instrumental in the ritual to bring out the heart of the sacrificial victim, which allowed light to reach the heart of the victim and therefore, was a mediator between life and death, between the divine realm and the human, between heaven, earth and the underworld. Since flint had the potential to make fire, it was considered an expression of celestial starlight on earth.
