= Teocalli of the Sacred War =

Archaeological artifact of Aztec origin

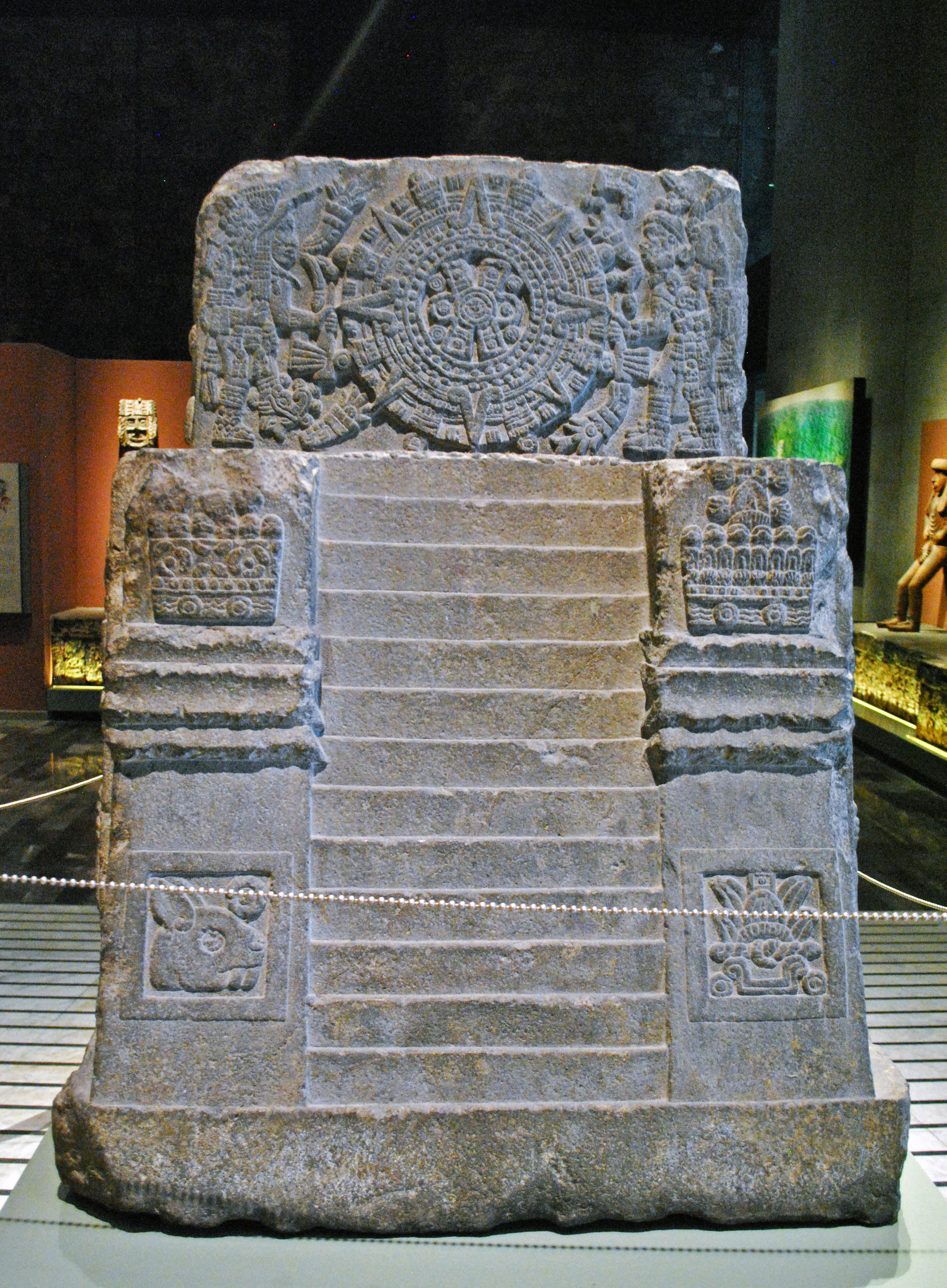
The Teocalli of the Sacred War.

The Teocalli of the Sacred War (teocalli is Nahuatl for "temple;" Spanish: El Teocalli de la Guerra Sagrada) is the name given by archaeologist Alfonso Caso to a monolithic pre-Columbian miniature of an Aztec temple, thought by some to have served as a throne for Motecuhzoma II.

The sculpture was first discovered in 1831 in the foundations of the National Palace of Mexico, but was not removed until the 1920s.

It is now located in the Museo Nacional de Antropología, Mexico City.

== Description and iconography ==
Generally speaking, the Teocalli is representative in form of Late Post-classic temple architecture and sculpture.

Two masses, a flat-roofed temple and a "truncated pyramid" complete with stairs up the front of the platform, compose the statue.

The upper part of the front of the sculpture contains a solar disk flanked by two figures; within the disk is the date Four Movement. The figures are identified as Huītzilōpōchtli (left) and at right either Tepēyōllōtl, a form of Tezcatlipoca or a depiction of Moctezuma II himself.

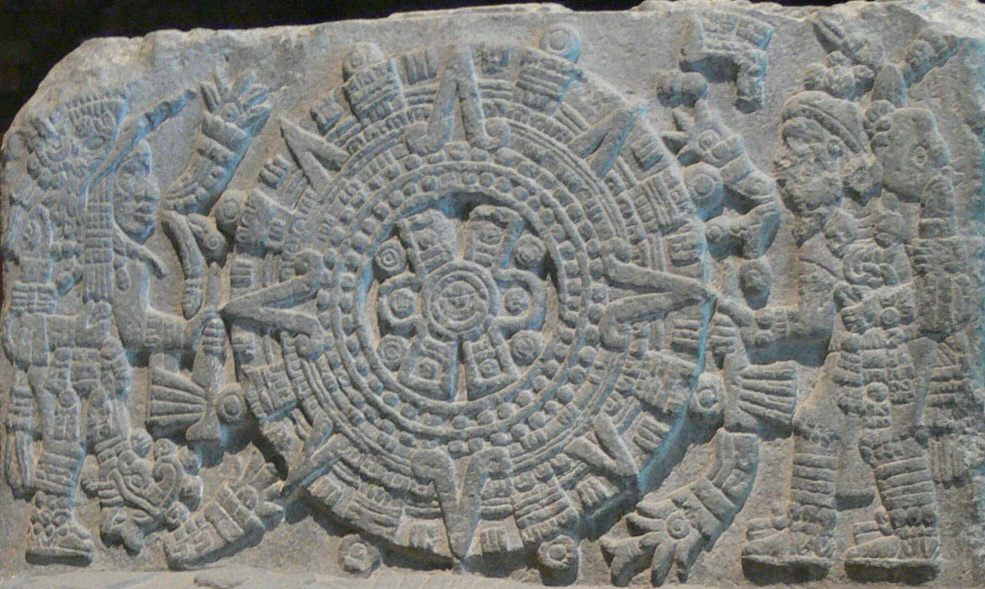

Below this, facing upwards, is a depiction of the earth deity Tlaltecuhtli, next to which is military equipment representing warfare.

The lower part of the front of the sculpture displays the dates One Rabbit (left) and Two Reed (right). The latter includes a rope representing the New Fire ceremony in that year. Together, the dates refer to both mythical events of the past as well as the beginning of a new cycle.

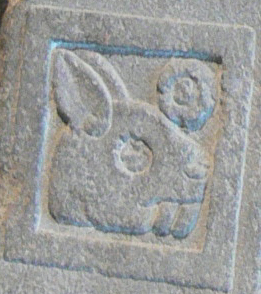

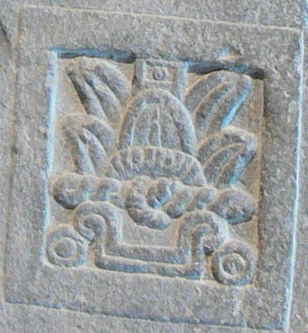

An illustration of the back of the Teocalli of the Sacred War

On the sides of the pyramid section of the Teocalli sit two pairs of figures carrying copal bags, maguey leaves, and tobacco containers. Caso identifies these four figures as Tláloc, Tlahuiscalpantecuhtli, Xochipilli, and Xiuhtecuhtli.

The top of the sculpture displays the date Two House.

On the back of the sculpture is a depiction of an eagle on a prickly pear cactus (similar to the coat of arms of Mexico). The eagle, a representation of Huītzilōpōchtli, holds in its beak the glyph for war, atl-tlachinolli. Although part of the relief has eroded, the cactus appears to grow from a defeated Chalchiuhtlicue, goddess of lakes and streams.

Finally, on the Teocalli's platform sits a zoomorphic "earth monster."

== Connection to Motecuhzoma II ==
Next to the figure of Tezcatlipoca is a hieroglyph containing the hair, ear plug, nose plug, and royal diadem of a ruler. This symbol is dubbed by Umberger the "Headdress Glyph".

These elements are said to have represented the name 'Motecuhzoma' in Post-Conquest pictorial codices and on other Mexica sculptures, including the Hackmack Box in Hamburg and the Calendar Stone of the Museo Nacional de Antropología.

In early studies of the Calendar Stone, the Headdress Glyph has had many previous interpretations, including as a fire symbol.

== Critical interpretations ==
In 1927, Alfonso Caso published a theory that the decoration on the sculpture “justified human sacrifice and warranted warfare as a means of procuring prisoners for immolation in the temples of Tenochtitlan.” This myth was regarded as the foundation of a "mystical-military" ideology in which the Mexica believed themselves to be the chosen people of the sun.

Other scholars, such as Enrique Juan Palacios, hold a more historical and less allegorical interpretation––reading the symbols as cosmograms. He argued that these cosmograms did not represent mythology, but rather represent the sacred nature of the Mexica as a whole. Palacios' interpretation of this Teocall received wide acclaim from scholars, and served as the foundation of his broader assessments on Mexica religion.

According to historian Richard Townsend, the earth zoomorph featured on the platform of the Teocalli represents Mexica land held by force of arms.
