= José Damián Ortiz de Castro =

Mexican architect (1750–1793)

- Born: 28 September 1750; Coatepec, Puebla, New Spain (modern-day Mexico).
- Died: 6 May 1793 (aged 42); Tacubaya, New Spain (modern-day Mexico City)
- Education: Royal Academy of San Carlos
- Occupation: Architect
- Projects: Towers and facade of the Mexico City Metropolitan Cathedral, Cathedral of Tulancingo, Royal Mexican Mint (Casa de Moneda de México).

José Damián Ortiz de Castro (1750–1793) was an 18th-century Novohispanic architect who carried out many construction works in Mexico City, such as the towers of the Mexico City Metropolitan Cathedral.

== Biography ==
José Damián Ortiz de Castro was born on September 28, 1750, and baptized at the Parish Church of San Jeronimo by priest subordinate Miguel Braulio. His father was a surveyor and master of architecture, José Martín Ortiz. He only had one brother, the architect Francisco Ortiz de Castro. His family was one of earliest Spanish families to establish themselves in the hinterland of Jalapa and Coatepec, whereas another family branch made their house in the metropolitan area of Puebla de Los Angeles, where they essentially maintained prominent roles as trustees of the municipal council as well as cathedral.

== Education ==
José Damián received his education from the Royal Academy of San Carlos. He learned and apprenticed under some of the most notable late-Spanish Baroque architects including Lorenzo Rodriguez, Francisco Antonio de Guerrero y Torres, Alejandro González Velázquez and Ignacio Castera.

== Career ==
Between 1772 and 1780, José Damián helped architect Miguel Constanzo in the works on the La Casa de Moneda, better known as the Mexican Mint. Together they created a neoclassical facade facing Correo Mayor Street. José Damián presented a study at the Academy of San Carlos on how different methods of fabrication could be used by construction entrepreneurs; he was thus recognized as the introducer of the use of plaster in architecture as well as other new materials at the time such as iron. Miguel Constanzo was professor of Geometry as well as Architecture at the Academy of San Carlos.

In 1779, José Damián supported Constanzo in the construction of the Santa Fe Gunpowder Factory in Chapultepec which was unfortunately destroyed by a tragic fire in 1784. Together they completed a series of small scale renovations and restorations in several city locations between 1780 and 1790. Additionally he oversaw the Plaza Mayor's pavement project in 1790, and in the following year, he and Miguel Constanzo constructed the public front next to the Mercy convent and the fountains meticulously positioned in the Plaza's corners.

When the work on the Metropolitan Cathedral was resumed in 1786, officials decided to hold a contest to decide the architect. Due to his reputation as an architect and innovator, and his work with Constanzo on the Mexican Mint and Santa Fe Poweder Facility, José Damián was awarded the commission to design the facade and towers of the Metropolitan Cathedral of Mexico City.

Ortiz de Castro exceptional construction work was also very noteworthy, as he demonstrated his excellent craftsmanship through the creation of the bells comprising the highest point of the cathedral. These bells, composed of tezontle, are merely the exterior covering sourced from Chiluca. Additionally, he devised a crane scheme to place each of the bells, including the biggest one, in their proper locations within the Cathedral itself. Furthermore, he took an active role in the Revillagigedos reforms to Mexico City. He worked on several projects, including leveling the Plaza Mayor and installing the Angulos fountains in 1793. Arguably his most significant accomplishment was the finishing touches of the towers and facade of Mexico's Cathedral. In 1781 he initially applied for the job of a more senior professor at the Cathedral of Mexico However to his surprise he wasn't offered to teach by the institution until 1787. Which was the very same year he won the contest to finish the facade and towers of the cathedral.

== Primary works ==
Facade and Towers Project of the Metropolitan Cathedral of Mexico City. As a central landmark the cathedral has undergone several phases of construction for more than two centuries. Throughout this time it has seen the influences and ideas of numerous architects as well as colonial administrators. Due to this the Cathedral itself does not necessarily follow any specific type of form or architecture. Like most buildings located in the central of Mexico City. In addition to this the Cathedral itself is built upon uneven ground. Therefore, fast forwarding to modern times there is no question that the building itself has been the subject of numerous repairs and engineering initiatives over the years.

Facade of the Tulancingo Cathedral Jose also had a considerably large part in the Tulancingo Cathedral's revisions. It is essentially a Catholic monastery that was originally built by the Franciscan Order in the year 1528. Furthermore, it is a large piece of Historical Mexican Architecture. In the forefront of the main square of La Floresta, found in the province of Hidalgo. its unique blend of simple yet highly imposing characteristics stands out in the Tulancingo historical center. It has become one of the most revered places in Mexico alone. The edifice was initially constructed in smaller sizes by the Franciscan Catholics who spread Christianity over the entire region. With the help of Jose Damian Ortiz de Castro the cathedral was expanded and refurbished by the year 1788. Since Mexico at the time was transitioning from Baroque to the simplicity of Neoclassic architecture, it makes sense that the building's style heavily changed.

Public Blazon on the Fence of the Temple of San Hipolito San Hipolito was finished in the 1730s, together with some of its structure made entirely of uncoated volcanic rock otherwise known as "tezontle." Which is Baroque in form, both the frontal columns have a distinct 45-degree angle, while the interiors and main bell tower are both Spanish in style. On the other hand, the layout has traditional Latin Cross with the main dome rising at the intersection. As the first structure in the Cordoban style to use the tapered pilaster, and estipite which is heavily embedded in 18th century architecture. The main entrance is adorned with a statute of San Hipolito set in a niche.

== Legacy ==
Jose Damian Ortiz de Castro was an architect whose career included renovation projects in New Spain. He incorporated iron into some of his architectural work, including the bell towers of buildings designed in the Baroque style. Not to mention the fact that after he participated in the expansion work of the Mint. He then became so interested in designing the world's very first and functioning coin lathe. In which became popular very quickly and effectively until it reached to be arguably one of the world's largest Mint Houses in its day.
