= Aztec medicine =

Medicine in Aztec folklore

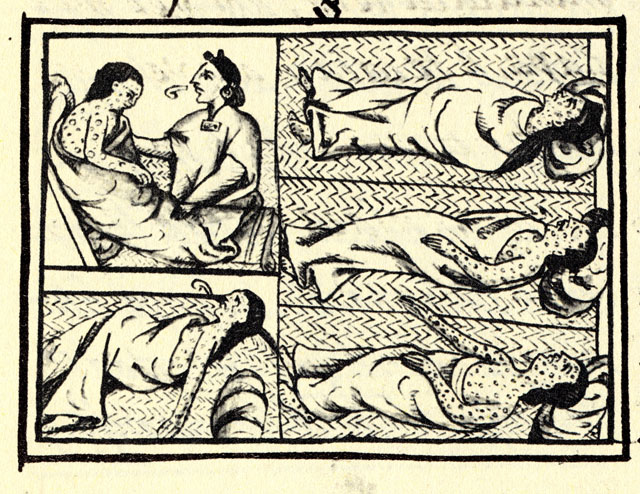
Drawing accompanying text in Book XII of the 16th-century Florentine Codex (compiled 1540–1585), showing Nahua of conquest-era central Mexico suffering from smallpox.

Aztec medicine concerns the body of knowledge, belief and ritual surrounding human health and sickness, as observed among the Nahuatl-speaking people in the Aztec realm of central Mexico. The Aztecs knew of and used an extensive inventory consisting of hundreds of different medicinal herbs and plants. A variety of indigenous Nahua and Novohispanic written works survived from the conquest and later colonial periods that describe aspects of the Aztec system and practice of medicine and its remedies, incantations, practical administration, and cultural underpinnings. Elements of traditional medicinal practices and beliefs are still found among modern-day Nahua communities, often intermixed with European or other later influences.

== Spiritual influences ==
As with many other Mesoamerican cultures, the Aztecs believed that the body contained a balance of three separate entities or souls: the tonalli, the teyolia, and the ihiyotl. This balance affected the health and life of a person. The tonalli, which was commonly attributed with the disease of "soul loss", was located in the upper part of the head. They believed that this life force was connected to a higher power, and the Aztec people had to make sure their tonalli was not lost or did not stray from the head. The teyolia was located in the heart. This entity has been described to be specific to the individual and stood for a person's knowledge and memory. The ihiyotl, which resided in the liver, was strongly attached to witchcraft and the supernatural. It could also leave the body but was always connected through the wind or an individual's breath, “...thus, each individual could affect other people and things by breathing on them.”

The Aztecs used magic to avoid illness and wore amulets as protection from it. Amulet is a small ornament which worn to avoid harm and evil.

== Illness from the gods/goddesses ==
The Aztecs believed in a life after death and heavily influenced by the gods. They believed in Tonatiuh (heaven) on the sun reserved for heroes after death, another heaven (Tlalocan) on earth and the resting place of the dead after dangerous journey in the underworld (Mictlan). The Tonalamatl (religious calendar) had an impactful role on the Aztec belief system. They believed that the Tonalamatl determined everything about the individual except their profession. A person's longevity, luck, sickness, and even their name was determined by the month and day they were born. The Tonalamatl was split into 13 months, each month representing a different god. The Codex Ríos depicts the relationship between human organs and calendar signs, illustrating the magical significance certain organs or body parts held.

Because the calendar had so much authority over a person's life, the day on which someone was born or got sick had great importance and usually gave reference to which god the individual had to pay respect to. It was believed that when you were sick, you were being punished by the gods for your sins in some cases. Specific sicknesses were linked to individual gods and their punishments. Tlaloc, the water god, was responsible for sickness related to wet and cold, such as rheumatic ailments. Tlaloc also was responsible for tremor, delirium and other symptoms of alcoholism for those who abused consuming pulque. To relieve these symptoms, people would travel to mountains and rivers of significance to present the god with offerings.

The flayed god, Xipe Totec, was responsible for skin eruptions and rashes. Common ailments included scabies, boils, and eye diseases. The way to treat this disease was to march in front of others wearing the skins from human sacrifices during the second month. After they did this, Xipe Totec would cure them of their ailments. When people broke vows such as fasting or celibacy, Tezcatlipoca would induce incurable disease. Macuilxochitl (Xochipilli), would send hemorrhoids, boils, and other similar diseases. There were many other gods as well, each connected to their own set of sicknesses. Understanding the reason for the ailments was a primary way of knowing which god sent the punishment. The ailments themselves were often not enough as multiple gods such as the god of pleasure and the god of love used similar punishments. Both would send venereal diseases. The mother of gods (Teteoinam or Toci) was worshiped and followed by those in the medical field. As the goddess of medicine and herbs, her image was always kept in view of medical practitioners.

== Ticitl ==
The word ticitl means "Aztec physician". Alonso de Molina translated ticitl not only as physician, but also as the witch who did horoscope and fortune teller. The medical profession in Aztec society was practiced by both men and women alike. This profession did not have high social standing even though they had to complete special training and have religious and astrological associations. When the illness wasn't serious, the Aztec's priest would often be called upon to take care of the sick. The ticitl had to have great knowledge to treat everyday diseases. Ticitl were also called upon if an illness or injury became serious, such as when a warrior would be wounded in battle. The ticitl were also good at performing surgical procedures by using knives which were made from volcanic glass (obsidian), the Ticitl would use these knives for procedures that involved the removing of tumors and the draining of wounds. Along with these obsidian knives, Ticitl would use different part of plants as tools for their procedures. For example, ticitl would use agave thorns as tools when performing surgeries that involved the eye. Not only did the Ticitl use their skills for medical purposes, their skills were also used for ceremonial purposes, for example, men entering the priesthood would have to be circumcised and the Ticitl were the one who had to perform this procedure due to their surgical skills.

The Ticitl even had a way of classifying different types of wounds and would place them in categories depending on the type of wound. The Ticitl became skilled at treating bone fractures due to them having to heal Aztec warriors that were wounded in battle. They would sew wounds with the help of strong fibers that would come from plants or they would even use strong hair strands from an animal. The Ticitl also had their own methods of stopping a bleeding wound and of relieving pain with the use of plants and even psychedelic mushrooms. Ticitl would also envelope wounds with crushed plants since they believed that the crushed plant can speed up the recovery.

== Diagnosis and treatment ==
Aztecs understood there was a balance between hot and cold in medical practice, bearing resemblance to Humorism. The procedures used by the ticitl were empirical and practical. Ticitl used different parts of plants to make medicines. The plants which were used were sacred to Tlaloc. Yauhtli and iztauhyatl are some plants that were commonly used by the ticitl. Ticitl treat patients by having them inhale, smoke or they would rub the patients by using certain plants. The plants would be ground and mixed to make liquids that would be used as medicines. Sap from the maguey was usually used to treat wounds and other injuries caused by battle.

Some of these treatments were so effective that they are still used in traditional medicine, for example, using maguey or agave sap is still an effective natural treatment because of the antibacterial properties of the maguey sap. Another property that made the use of the sap to be favored and made it an effective treatment is how sticky it is; this property helped the sap absorb moisture and debris from the wound and it would provide a cleansing effect that helped to prevent infection. The Aztec healers also incorporated the use of salt into their treatments because it would help absorb moisture and help decrease inflammation. The Ticitl combined these two ingredients and it improved the effectiveness of treating wounds even further. The addition of salt would draw up moisture even further and this would help promote a faster healing process and it would keep the wound from drying out, which helped to alleviate some of the pain. The Ticitl gained so much knowledge in healing and treating wounds because of how often the Aztecs went to war with other tribes. For example, the Ticitl would use the maguey sap to help cover surgical wounds such as when reattaching severed extremities or stitching back a wound that was obtained during battle. They also found different ways of preparing the maguey sap, for example, using the sap of the same plant at different growing stages or boiling the sap was found to be more effective at treating certain injuries.

Religious treatments were varied based on which god issued the punishment and the ailment itself. During the second month of the Aztec calendar, there is a festival called Tlacaxipehualiztl, honoring "the flayed one". This festival was an important event for those wishing to be cured from the ailments sent by the gods. Those wishing to be cured would cover themselves with agave. Medical practices and treatment consisted of a combination of medical botany and an understanding of the supernatural. Establishing a treatment for any given ailment depended first upon determining the nature of its cause, which could be the result of the supernatural. The presence of a disease could often indicate the existence of a communion with the supernatural world.

== Herbal medicine ==
Aztec Herbal Medicines
Botanical name	Nahuatl name	Uses
Artemisia mexicana	Itztuahyatl	Weakness, colic, reduce fever; coughing
Bocconia frutescens	Cococxihuitl	Constipation, abscesses, swelling
Bromelia pinguin	Mexocotl	heat blisters in the mouth
Carica papaya	Chichihualxo-chitl	Latex unripe fruit for rash ulcer; ripe fruit digestive
Casimiroa edulis	Cochitzapotl	sedative
Cassia occidentalis or Cassia alata	Totoncaxihuitl	Astringent, purgative, anthelmintic, relieves fever, inflammation of rashes
Chenopodium graveolens	Epazotl	Against dysentery, anthelmintic, helps asthmatics breathe
Euphorbia calyculata	Cuauhtepatli; chupiri	Purgative, skin ailments, mange, skin sores
Helianthus annuus	Chilamacatl	fever
Liquidambar styraciflua	Ocotzotl; xochiocotzotl quanhxihuitl	Rashes, toothache, tonic for stomach
Montanoa tomentosa	Cihuapatli	Diuretic, oxytocic, cures hydropesia
Passiflora jorullensis	Coanenepilli	Causes sweating, Diuretic, pain reliever, poisons and snake bites
Perezia adnata	Pipitzahuac	Purgative, cathartic, coughing, sore throat
Persea americana	Auacatl; ahuaca quahuitl	Astringent, treat sores, remove scars
Pithecolobium dulce	Quamochitl	Astringent, causes sneezing, cures ulcers and sores
Plantago mexicana	Acaxilotic	Vomit and cathartic
Plumbago pulchella	Tlepatli; tletlematil; itzcuinpatli	Diuretic, colic, gangrene
Psidium guajava	Xalxocotl	Digestion, dysentery, mange
Rhamnus serrata	Tlalcapulin	Dysentery, bloody bowels
Salix lasiopelis	Quetzalhuexotl	Stops blood from rectum, cures fever
Schoenocaulon coulteri; Veratrum frigidum	Zoyoyatic	Causes sneezing, kills mice/lice/flies
Smilax atristolochiaefolia	Mecapatli	Causes sweating, diuretic, relieves joint pain
Tagetes erecta	Cempohualxochitl	Causes sweating, cathartic, cures dropsy
Talauma mexicana	yolloxochitl	Comforts heart, used against sterility
Theobroma cacao	Cacahuaquahuitl	Excess diarrhea, can cause dizziness

== See also ==
- Curandero
- Libellus de Medicinalibus Indorum Herbis
- Maya medicine
- Entheogenics and the Maya
- Mesoamerican medicine
