= Oracionista =

Type of traditional healer in Latin America and the US

An oracionista is a specific type of curandera who works through prayer and prayer songs (oraciones) to heal the sick. As with other methods of modern curanderismo, this form of prayer healing is heavily influenced by Roman Catholicism as well as the indigenous traditions of a given region. The ability to heal is thought to work through a spiritual gift known as “el don”. The oracionista is thought to have received her healing gift through an apprenticeship, family lineage or visionary experience.

== See also ==
- Faith healing
