= Pulchellidin =

Names
- IUPAC name 3,3′,4′,5′,7-Pentahydroxy-5-methoxyflavylium
- Systematic IUPAC name 3,7-Dihydroxy-5-methoxy-2-(3,4,5-trihydroxyphenyl)-1λ^{4}-benzopyran-1-ylium

Identifiers
CAS Number	19077-86-2
3D model (JSmol)	Interactive image
ChemSpider	57567954
PubChem CID	14496545
UNII	9ZKF4YRM6S
CompTox Dashboard (EPA)	DTXSID30561013
- InChI: InChI=1S/C16H12O7/c1-22-13-4-8(17)5-14-9(13)6-12(20)16(23-14)7-2-10(18)15(21)11(19)3-7/h2-6H,1H3,(H4-,17,18,19,20,21)/p+1 Key: SVUQABVHSHQZHD-UHFFFAOYSA-O
- SMILES: Oc1cc2c(OC)cc(O)cc2[o+]c1c3cc(O)c(O)c(O)c3

Properties
Chemical formula	C_{16}H_{13}O_{7} or C_{16}H_{13}O_{7}^{+}, Cl^{−} (C_{16}H_{13}ClO_{7})
Molar mass	317.27 g/mol
- Except where otherwise noted, data are given for materials in their standard state (at 25 °C [77 °F], 100 kPa). verify (what is ?) Infobox references

Pulchellidin (Pl) is an O-methylated anthocyanidin. It is a blue-red plant pigment. It can be found in Plumbago pulchella.

== Glycosides ==
- Pulchellidin 3-rhamnoside (molecular formula : C_{22}H_{23}O_{11}, exact mass : 463.124036578) is reported in Plumbago coerulea whereas pulchellidin 3-glucoside (C_{22}H_{23}O_{12}, exact mass : 479.1189512) is reported in Plumbago pulchella
