= Maya medicine =

Medicine in the ancient Maya civilization

Maya medicine concerns health and medicine among the ancient Maya civilization. It was a complex blend of mind, body, religion, ritual and science. Important to all, medicine was practiced only by a select few, who generally inherited their positions and received extensive education. These shamans acted as a medium between the physical world and spirit world. They practiced sorcery for the purpose of healing, foresight, and control over natural events.

In understanding Maya medicine, it is important to recognize that the Maya equated sickness with the captivity of one's soul by supernatural beings, angered by some perceived misbehavior. For this reason, curing a sickness involved elements of ritual, cleansing and herbal remedy. Research of Maya ethnomedicine shows that though supernatural causes are related to illness, a large percentage of Maya medical texts are devoted to the treatment of symptoms based upon objective observations of the effects of certain plants on the human system. Herbal remedies were ingested, smoked, snorted, rubbed on the skin, and even used in the form of enemas to force rapid absorption of a substance into the blood stream. Cleansing techniques included fasting, sweating and purging flushed substances out of the body.

Maya medicinal practices have continued into contemporary times including the usage of plant and herbal medicines to treat ailments such as women's health concerns.

== Medicine ==
Medicine men, known to the ancient Maya as ah-men, held the special ability to alter consciousness to determine causes for events not understood, such as reasons for illness or misfortune.

Since it was perceived by the Maya that sickness was a punishment for a mistake or transgression, it was important that the healer inquire about details of the past of the sick person. This was done in a methodological fashion, first inquiring about ascriptive attributes, followed by specific events of the person's life, and lastly about circumstantial or acquired attributes. This aspect of the medicine man's job would be similar to a modern-day therapy session.

In addition to ritualistic and spiritual elements, the medicine man had extensive knowledge of medicinal plants and how they should be used. After studying the symptoms of a sickness, a medicine man may prescribe a remedy to his patient. The number of times or days that the remedy should be ingested or applied depended on an individual's gender; typically the number thirteen was associated with men, and the number nine with women.

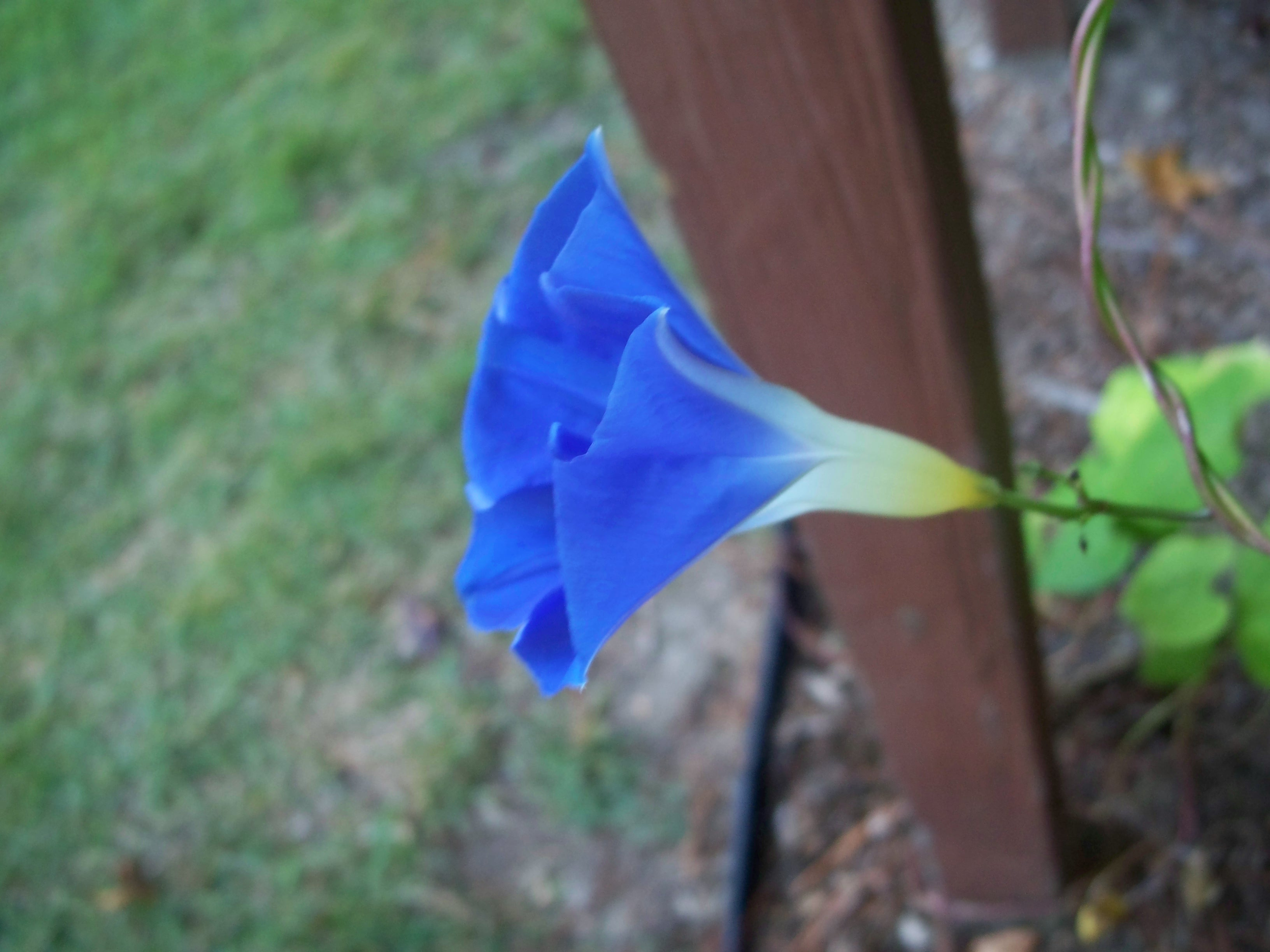
Morning glory was used by ancient Mayan healers.

The Maya had a broad range of vocabulary to describe internal human anatomy, such as hobnel for intestines and kah for bile, as well as knowledge of general functions of body systems, in particular the female reproductive system. In pathology, over two hundred terms described organic conditions, such as thuhuzen meaning a deep bronchial cough, zen meaning largyneal cough, and tiptec meaning intestinal pain with pulsation, speculated to have been appendicitis. The Maya acknowledged mental afflictions such as melancholia and hallucinations, were capable of understanding the grouping of symptoms relating to contagious diseases, and identified several diseases including pinta and leishmaniasis.

The medicine men of ancient Maya society provided many services to their communities and were held in high regard. Known for their extensive knowledge and spirituality, medicine men were called upon for many reasons, but most often for their healing capabilities. These Maya doctors often employed specialists for specific healing techniques such as bone-setting and childbirth, similar to the method of modern doctors. Bone setting was done by a designated bone-binder, or kax-bac. In addition to his duties as a doctor and sorcerer, a medicine man not only cured diseases, but also sporadically accepted compensation to cause them. The ah-man was also called ah-pul-yaah, the "disease thrower".

Although a large number of Mesoamerican civilizations around the Classic period practiced trepanation with great dexterity and success, such as the Zapotec in Oaxaca, little evidence of drilling trepanation is found in the Maya region outside of skull impressions surmised to have more to do with cranioplasty than medical relief.

== Dentistry ==
The Maya performed filings of natural teeth as well as tooth shaping. These were distinct to each region and tribe. For instance, the materials within the Copan Valley differ from the materials seen in the nearby vicinity. Fillings differ from sealants as they maintain their shape within the space of the tooth while sealants are a treatment to help prevent tooth decay. They can also vary in style depending on the tooth being filled and the cavity that is being shaped. They were often created by drilling using a hard thin circular tube to create a circular divot into the tooth. The drill was made of jade or copper. The circular divot would be created using a bow drill or spinning the circular tube between hands. Fillings were done skillfully and so they did not irreparably damage the tooth. Fillings were more common in adolescents but they occurred throughout all stages of life. While environmental and genetics play a role in fillings another factor is the diet. Since the Maya consumed maize it could increase the likelihood of cavities and consequently fillings.

They also performed sealants. Maya dental cements were complex. There were various options that could match the different colors of the fillings or inlays. They were not only hygienic but likely also had therapeutic properties. They were likely made by local traditions and through the available materials they had nearby. This would explain the differences between regions. Sealants were frequently colored to match inlays. This indicates that not only were they used for purpose beyond maintaining the tooth. They have been linked to both class and beauty standards. In the Maya Lowlands, they were made of a blend from organic components including hydroxyapatite and calcium phosphates. The Maya would also polish their teeth. This was part of their regular dental hygiene. Another study has evaluated tooth filing as a form of oral hygiene.

Tooth modification is a key part of the Maya dentistry. There were other body modifications that were a key part of Classic Maya culture such as piercings and tattoos. The Romero Classification defines tooth modification in Mesoamerican individuals. It includes altered crown and shape of surface tooth. A majority of the studies done on tooth modification have been conducted in southern Mexico and some in Central America. These were seen as a form of expression. They could also be seen as a class indicator. There are recent studies that note DNA connections between tooth modifications. This indicates that there is not only a class status but perhaps a social one as well. This link was noted between females as it was matrilineal DNA analysis. The Mayan idea of a "perfect smile" differs from the western idea of a straight white smile that is seen today. Instead it emphasizes self identity and social structures.

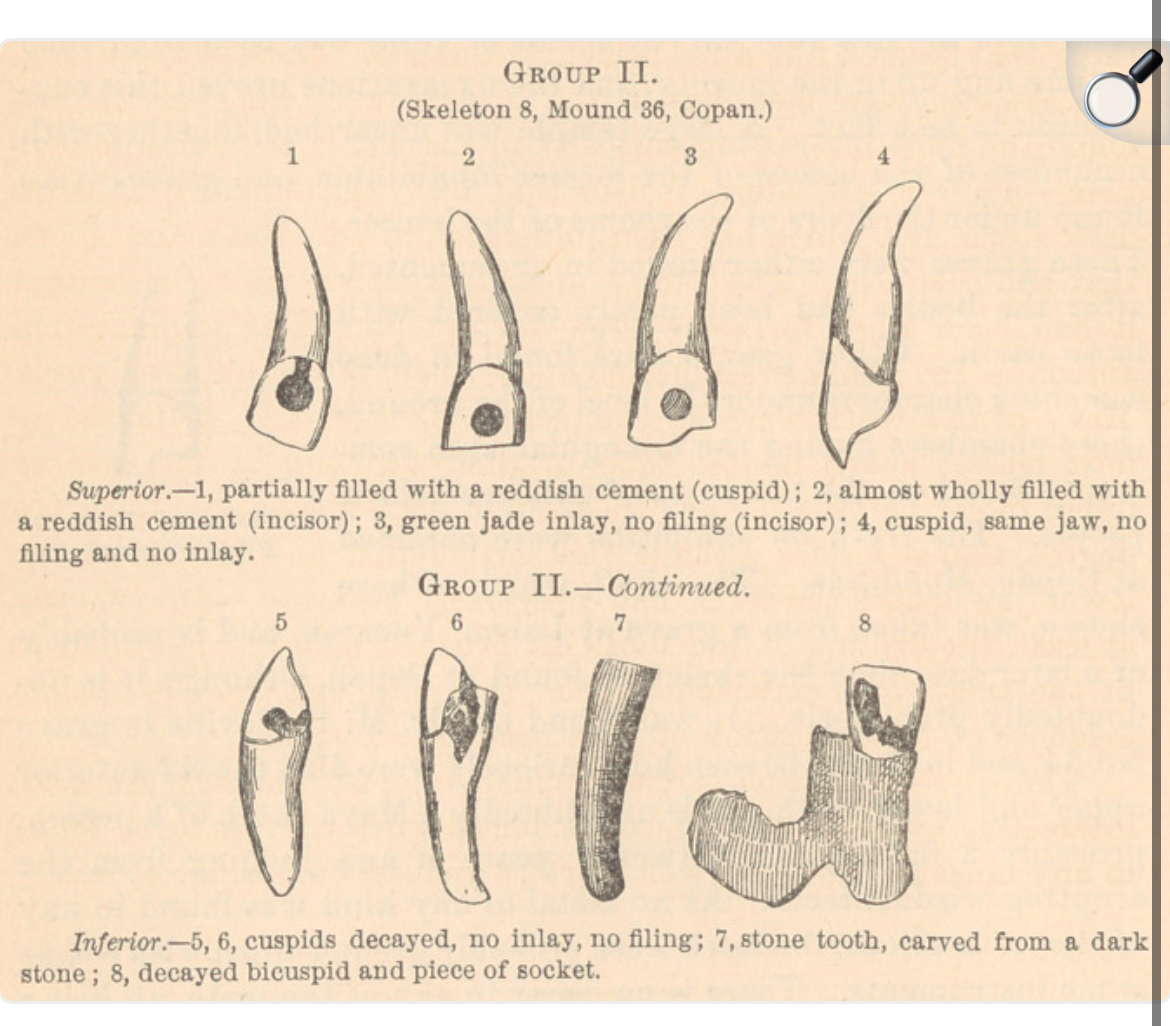
1- cuspid (red cement), 2- incisor (red cement), 3- incisor (jade), 3- cuspid (no inlay)

Inlays are a restorative dental modification that is in the groves of teeth usually done with decorative material such as gold or other colorful materials. For the Maya, inlays had a cosmetic purpose and could be made of various minerals and colors. These were complex procedures, and few penetrated to the pulp of the teeth. Many inlays that are recovered now are still intact. They were more prevalent prior to Spanish colonization. After post-Spanish colonization there are less records of the dental practices. This is due to identity restriction practices that were placed upon the Maya. However, it is known that some of the significance behind dental modifications was lost due to colonization. They were likely seen as a symbol of beauty and class status. Notability, men were more likely to have inlays. However, both men and women's inlays were usually similar in size, color and placement. Age played a factor in when someone would get dental modifications. It was common to get inlays after adolescence, usually some time in their 20s and 30s. However, there are records of people getting these modifications as young as 10. This is because their teeth are not fully developed and the tooth could be lost.

The Maya were also the first to use dental implants. They successfully used shell valves to mimic teeth and create functional implants. These bore an "astonishing" resemblance to natural teeth. The tooth sockets would have been drilled with the manual bow drills similar to a filling. The shells were put into the tissue right after the teeth had been removed. The patient would have likely been given anesthesia from the local knowledge of plants.

New evidence indicates dental modification, widely established as an aesthetic practice, was also practiced for medical purposes; skeletal remains recovered at the Piedras Negras S-Sector site indicated dental extractions on teeth affected by caries among other methods of dental modification. Dental surgeons made jade and turquoise prostheses and filled teeth with iron pyrite for practical use beyond the well-documented aesthetic use of dental inlays for status display. Surgical practices included wound suturing with human hair and fish bones and fracture reduction.

== Ritual practices ==
Maya rituals differ from region to region, but many similar patterns in ceremonies, whether being performed for individual or group need, have been noted. First, all rituals are preceded by foresight of a medicine man, who determines the day of the ceremony through calendrical divination. The medicine men of the Ixil Maya of Guatemala, who kept track of days in their heads, would lay out red seeds from the coral tree onto the pre-Columbian calendar to count them and figure out what day best suited the specific ritual. As a symbol of a spiritual purification, the individual or individuals would observe a fasting and abstinence period before the ritual day.

Consistent patterns are shown throughout the Maya world as to the happenings of the day of the ritual as well. During the ceremony, elements including expulsion of the evil spirit from the participant, incensing of the idols, prayers, offerings, and sacrifices were all practiced. If the ritual was used to cure a disease, the offering may be in the form of food or ornaments, and sacrifice in the form of human bloodletting. Following the ceremony would be dancing, feasting, and ritual drinking by all, characterized by the Spaniards as a general drunkenness.

Ritual burials of plants has also been demonstrated at ancient Maya archaeological sites. These "healing bundles" contain medicinal plants aimed at addressing specific ailments alongside hallucinogenic plants for divine communication. Packages were placed underground or underneath floors in homes as offerings to gods for good health. This practice intertwines both the therapeutic and religious aspects of Maya medicine to form a holistic cultural tradition.

Today the Maya keep many of the ritualistic traditions of their ancestors. Elements of prayer, offerings, blood sacrifice (replacing human blood with that of sacrificed chickens), burning of copal incense, dancing, and ritual drinking continue in traditional ceremonies. It is noted that even ritualistic practice can have real effects on neurotransmitters and immunological functioning.

== Sweat baths ==
An important purification element to the ancient Maya was the sweat bath, temazcal. Similar to a modern-day sauna, sweat baths were constructed of stone walls and ceilings, with a small opening in the top of the ceiling. Water poured onto the hot rocks in the room created steam, offering a setting in which to sweat out impurities. Sweat baths were used for a range of conditions and situations. New mothers who had recently conceived a child would seek revitalization in them, while people who were sick could find healing power in sweating.

Maya rulers made a habit out of visiting the sweat baths as well because it left them feeling refreshed and, as they believed, cleaner. In addition, Maya rulers performed ritual purification ceremonies to appease the gods and secure the well-being of their communities. It is hypothesized that kings popularized this method of healing because of their regular use of sweat baths. Archeologists have uncovered sweat baths at sites including Tikal, Aguateca and Nakbe, but the most impressive find to date is in Piedras Negras, a Classic Maya city in Guatemala. In addition to the recognizable palaces, temples and ball courts, archaeologists have uncovered eight stone buildings that served as sweat baths to the Maya royalty. Steambaths are still in use among the contemporary Tzotzil and Tzeltal Maya of highland Chiapas, and are associated with a wide range of medicinal plants and postpartum therapies.

== Plant and herbal medicine ==
The study and observation of plants has been of high importance to the Maya for centuries. However, the study of medicinal plants was limited to the priestly class. Plants and herbal remedies were often used in collaboration with other techniques to cure disease. Knowledge of the effects of certain plants on human beings was often used to prescribe an antidote to a particular ailment, but it is also important to note that medicine men also frequently relied on the color of a plant or other remedy in certain situations. For instance, yellow plants and fruits were used in curing jaundice; red for problems characterized by blood; and burned feathers of red birds in curing yellow fever.

In addition to color, smell and taste were used for sensory based plant selection of medicinal plants. This sensory based system often times has scientific grounding in the chemical make-up of plants. Plants that are more aromatic were used to cure respiratory illnesses. Aromatic plants generally have high concentrations of essential oils, which are small, volatile, organic compounds that plants produce consisting of terpenes. The terpene compounds can disrupt bacterial and fungal cell membranes which means they can have antimicrobial effects and can help infections. Aromatic plants frequently used include Mentha, Satureja, Ocimum (mint family), and citrus. Plants that have an astringent taste such as Guava, are often used for gastrointestinal inflammation and diarrhea. Astringent plants have tannins which are biomolecules called polyphenols. In the body, tannins can bind to proteins in the gut lining, helping to reduce inflammation and secretion.

In cases of skin irritation, wounds, and headaches, fresh vegetation was often used in the form of plasters applied directly to the skin. Plasters were also rubbed on the skin to shield spirits. Depending on the ailment, plants were boiled and used in herbal drinks and/or baths, eaten raw, snorted, smoked, or inserted into one of the body's orifices. Common plants used for medicine include, but are not limited to, chili peppers, cacao, tobacco, agave, and the pitarilla tree. In addition, animal parts, such as those from the crocodile, insects, fish and birds were combined into the herbal concoctions. In most cases, a mixture of plant and animal product was prepared to cure a specific ailment.

== Entheogens ==
For the most part, mind-altering substances were used in rituals by medicine men to achieve a higher state of consciousness or trance-like state. These substances were used for mental and spiritual health purposes. Flora such as peyote, the morning glory, certain mushrooms, tobacco, and plants used to make alcoholic substances, were commonly used. The smoking of tobacco mixed with other plants produced a trance-like state. Extremely strong alcoholic substances were used at rituals. Hallucinogens were used to communicate with the spirit world. A number of these substances were used not to cure sickness, but instead for pain relief. In addition, as depicted in Maya pottery and carvings, ritual enemas were used for a more rapid absorption and effect of the substance. In addition to direct administration, hallucinogenic plants were utilized in ritual plant burials for divine communication. In contrast to modern culture, these remedies were used to restore balance and harmony to the body.

== Women's reproductive health ==
Compared to Western populations, Q'eqchi Maya women in Guatemala have reported significantly less incidence of negative symptoms of menstruation, menopause, pregnancy, and childbirth. These responses are attributed to the ethnomedical practices present in Maya communities including the usage of plants in the Piperaceae family to address symptoms such as pain and cramping.

Today, traditional Mayan medicine continues to comprise the majority of women's healthcare in Guatemala.

== See also ==
- Aztec medicine
- Curandero
