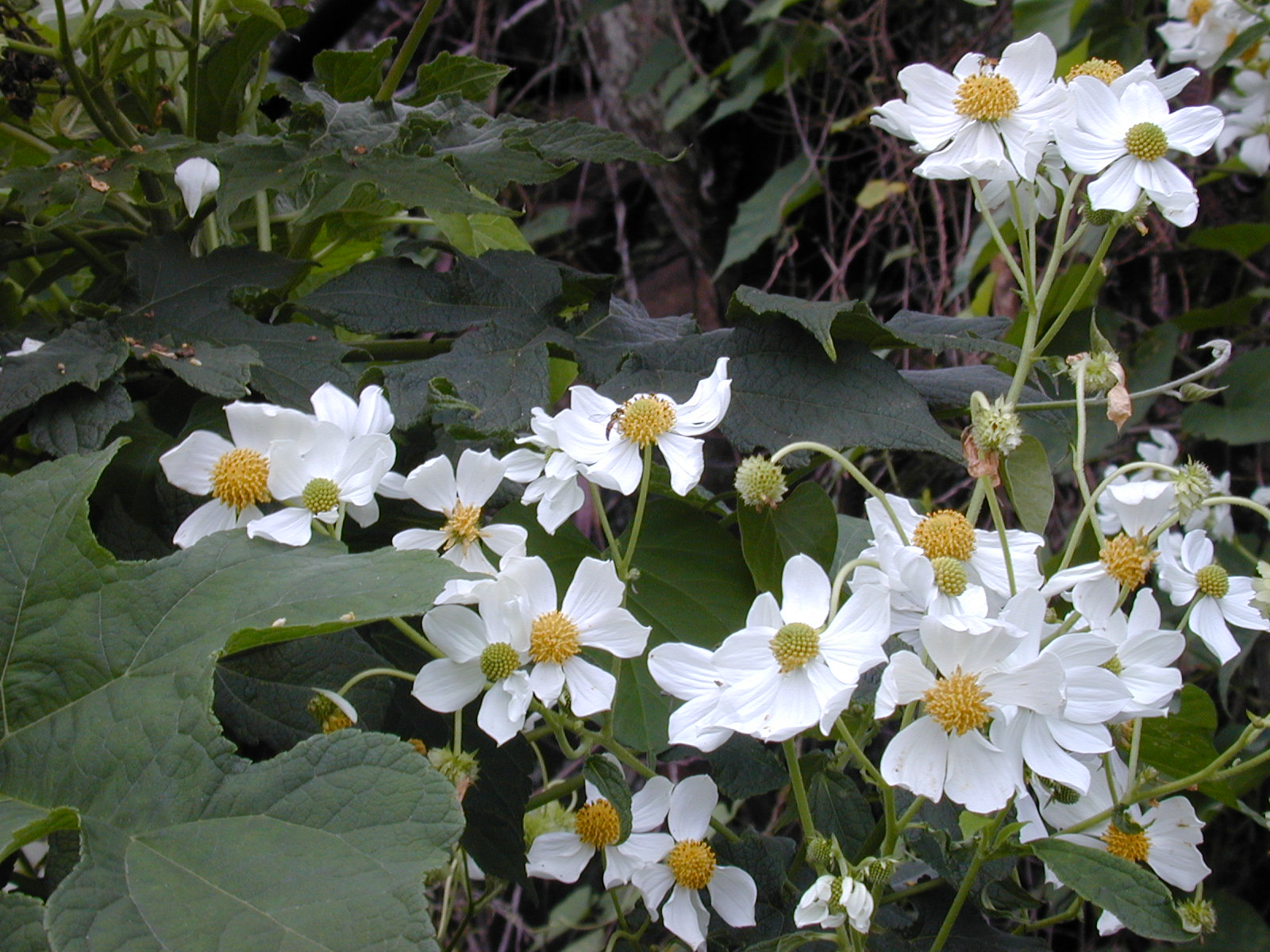
- Montanoa hibiscifolia

Scientific classification
- Kingdom: Plantae
- Clade: Tracheophytes
- Clade: Angiosperms
- Clade: Eudicots
- Clade: Asterids
- Order: Asterales
- Family: Asteraceae
- Subfamily: Asteroideae
- Tribe: Heliantheae
- Subtribe: Montanoinae; H.Rob.
- Genus: Montanoa; Cerv.

Type species
- Montanoa tomentosa Cerv.

Synonyms
- Eriocarpha Cass.; Eriocoma Kunth; Montagnaea DC.; Uhdea Kunth

= Montanoa =

Genus of flowering plants

Montanoa is a genus of flowering plants in the tribe Heliantheae, within the family Asteraceae.

They are thought to be named after Luis Josė Montaña (1755-1820), a leading Mexican physician of his time.

Species

- Montanoa andersonii McVaugh - Jalisco
- Montanoa aschenbornii Sch.Bip. ex K.Koch - Mexico
- Montanoa atriplicifolia (Pers.) Sch.Bip. - Yucatán, Central America
- Montanoa auriculata Cuatrec. - Colombia
- Montanoa bipinnatifida (Kunth) K.Koch - central Mexico
- Montanoa crenata Sch.Bip. ex K.Koch - Mexico
- Montanoa echinacea S.F.Blake - Oaxaca to Honduras
- Montanoa frutescens (Mairet ex DC.) Hemsl. - central Mexico
- Montanoa gracilis Sch.Bip. ex K.Koch - Oaxaca
- Montanoa grandiflora (DC.) Sch.Bip. ex Benth. - Guerrero to Honduras
- Montanoa guatemalensis B.L.Rob. & Greenm. - Chiapas to Costa Rica
- Montanoa hexagona B.L.Rob. & Greenm. - Chiapas
- Montanoa hibiscifolia Benth. - Nicaragua, Costa Rica
- Montanoa imbricata V.A.Funk - Guerrero
- Montanoa josei V.A.Funk - Colombia
- Montanoa karwinskii DC. - Mexico
- Montanoa laskowskii McVaugh - Jalisco
- Montanoa lehmannii Hieron. - Colombia
- Montanoa leucantha (Lag.) S.F.Blake - Mexico
- Montanoa liebmannii (Sch.Bip.) S.F.Blake - Oaxaca
- Montanoa mollissima Brongn. ex Brongn. - Mexico
- Montanoa moritziana Sch.Bip. - Colombia
- Montanoa olivae Sch.Bip. ex K.Koch - Jalisco
- Montanoa ovalifolia Deless. ex DC. - Colombia, Ecuador
- Montanoa pittieri Rob. & Greenm. - Costa Rica
- Montanoa pteropoda S.F.Blake - Guatemala
- Montanoa quadrangularis Sch.Bip. - Colombia, Venezuela
- Montanoa revealii H.Rob. - Guerrero
- Montanoa rosei Rose ex B.L.Rob. & Greenm. - Sinaloa, Sonora
- Montanoa schottii A.Rob. & Greenm. - Yucatán
- Montanoa speciosa (DC.) Sch.Bip. ex K.Koch - San Luis Potosí to Nicaragua
- Montanoa standleyi V.A.Funk - Chiapas, Oaxaca
- Montanoa ternifolia (Hemsl.) Sch.Bip. ex K.Koch - Mexico
- Montanoa tomentosa Cerv. - Nuevo León to Costa Rica
- Montanoa triloba Sch.Bip. - Mexico
