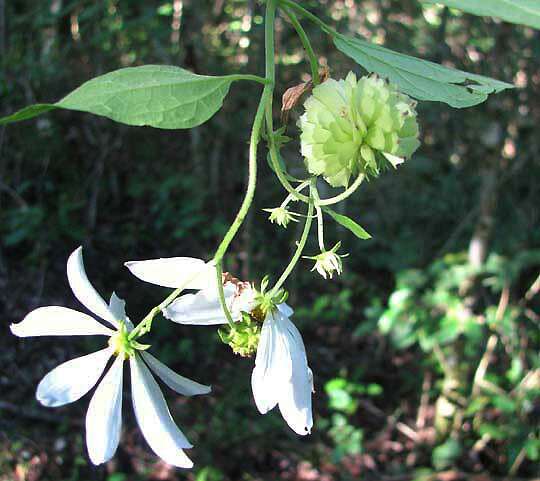
- Montanoa atriplicifolia flowering and fruiting heads

Scientific classification
- Kingdom: Plantae
- Clade: Tracheophytes
- Clade: Angiosperms
- Clade: Eudicots
- Clade: Asterids
- Order: Asterales
- Family: Asteraceae
- Tribe: Heliantheae
- Genus: Montanoa
- Species: M. atriplicifolia

Binomial name
- Montanoa atriplicifolia (Pers.) Sch.Bip. ex Klatt

Synonyms
- Eriocoma atriplicifolia (Pers.) Kuntze; Verbesina atriplicifolia Pers.; Galinsoga discolor Spreng.; Montanoa dumicola Klatt; Montanoa pauciflora Klatt; Montanoa schottii B.L.Rob. & Greenm.

= Montanoa atriplicifolia =

Species of flowering plant

Montanoa atriplicifolia, sometimes called daisy vine, Yucatan daisy and other names, is a species of shrub or vine belonging to the family Asteraceae.

== Description ==
All the 29 or so species of Montanoa can be referred to as "daisy trees" because of their attractive, daisy-like flower heads with white, petal-like ray florets and yellow "eye" composed of disc florets. Leaves with obvious petioles develop opposite one another on woody stems. However, the most eye-catching and distinctive botanical feature of Montanoa atriplicifolia is this:

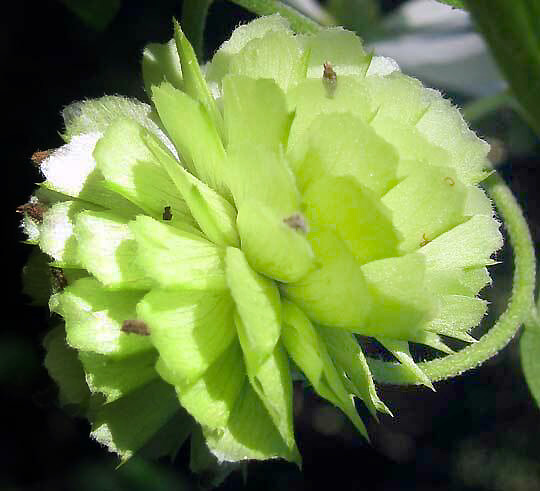
Montanoa atriplicifolia head of immature fruits with greatly enlarged, papery paleae

In the flower head, or capitulum, there's a scale-like bract beside each yellow disc floret, the palea, which after the flower is pollinated greatly enlarges to form a papery, net-veined, wafer-like structure broadest near its straight (not curved) apex, and which falls with the mature, much smaller, one-seeded, cypsela-type fruits.

Beyond that, here are features distinguishing Montanoa atriplicifolia from other daisy trees.

- Flower heads when mature tend to hang downward on petioles which along their sides don't bear low, flat ridges, or "wings", of blade tissue.
- Disc florets number 85-120.
- Corollas of the yellow disc-florets are particularly small, only about 2 mm (1/16 in) tall, while the petal-like corollas of the ray florets are 12–24 mm (1/2–1 in) long.

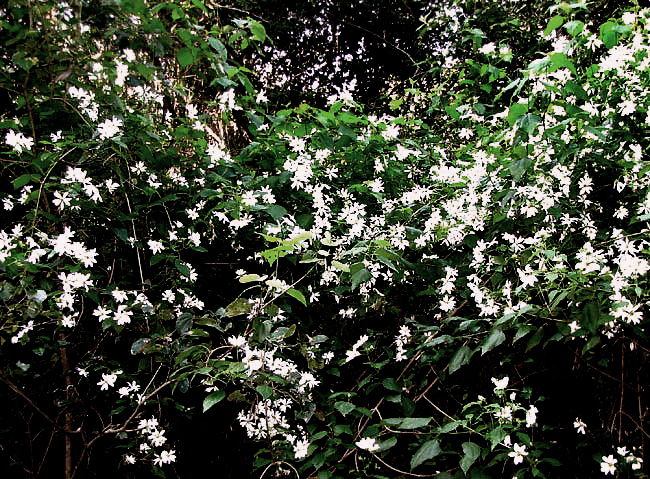
Montanoa atriplicifolia mass of flower heads on woody, viney stems

Especially in Mexico's Yucatan Peninsula, Montanoa atriplicifolia may appear as a much branching vine. At higher elevations elsewhere and in wetter environments, however, it's more likely to exhibit a shrub habit.

== Distribution ==
Montanoa atriplicifolia is native to the southernmost Mexican state of Chiapas and Mexico's Yucatan Peninsula south through Central America into Costa Rica.

== Habitat ==
In Mexico's Yucatan Peninsula Montanoa atriplicifolia occurs in coastal scrub, in various kinds of low-growing tropical deciduous forests, including those with columnar cacti, and in disturbed areas. Pictures on this page are from an individual in an open treefall area on limestone bedrock in the forest adjacent to Chichén Itzá Ruins in Yucatán, Mexico. In Nicaragua, Montanoa atriplicifolia is characteristic of disturbed areas and rocky, nutrient-poor soils in the process of desertification.

== Human uses ==
In Mexico's Yucatan Peninsula, Montanoa atriplicifolia is recognized as providing nectar for honey production, plus it is used as a floral offering in religious contexts.

=== Medicinal ===
In Mexico's Yucatan Peninsula, Mayan communities use Montanoa atriplicifolia both an ornamental and as a stimulant.

=== In gardens ===
In tropical and subtropical regions Montanoa atriplicifolia is uncommonly used among landscapers, despite its prolifically providing attractive white flowers serving as excellent pollen sources for honey bees. The plant's growth form is unusual, seeming "... to be one of those plants that is somewhere in the middle, neither shrub nor vine," as described by one nursery owner.

In rainy Singapore it's noted that cultivated plants of Montanoa atriplicifolia do best under full sun on moist, well-drained soil, and must be pruned to promote the bushy growth seen in drier environments.

== Taxonomy ==
Montanoa atriplicifolia is most closely related to Montanoa pteropoda, of Mexico's southernmost state of Chiapas and southern Guatemala; also it displays a vine-like habit, a large number of exceptionally small disc florets, and palea features.

=== Etymology ===
The genus name Montanoa honors the Mexican politician and botanist Luis Montaña. In 1825 the genus was named by Pablo de La Llave & Juan José Martínez de Lejarza (or Lexarza). La Llave chose names celebrating Hispanic botanists, not only Montanoa but also Calibrachoa for Antonio de la Cal y Bracho.

The species name atriplicifolia is a New Latin construction, meaning that its foliage is similar to that of members of the genus Atriplex, though the similarity may seem slight.
