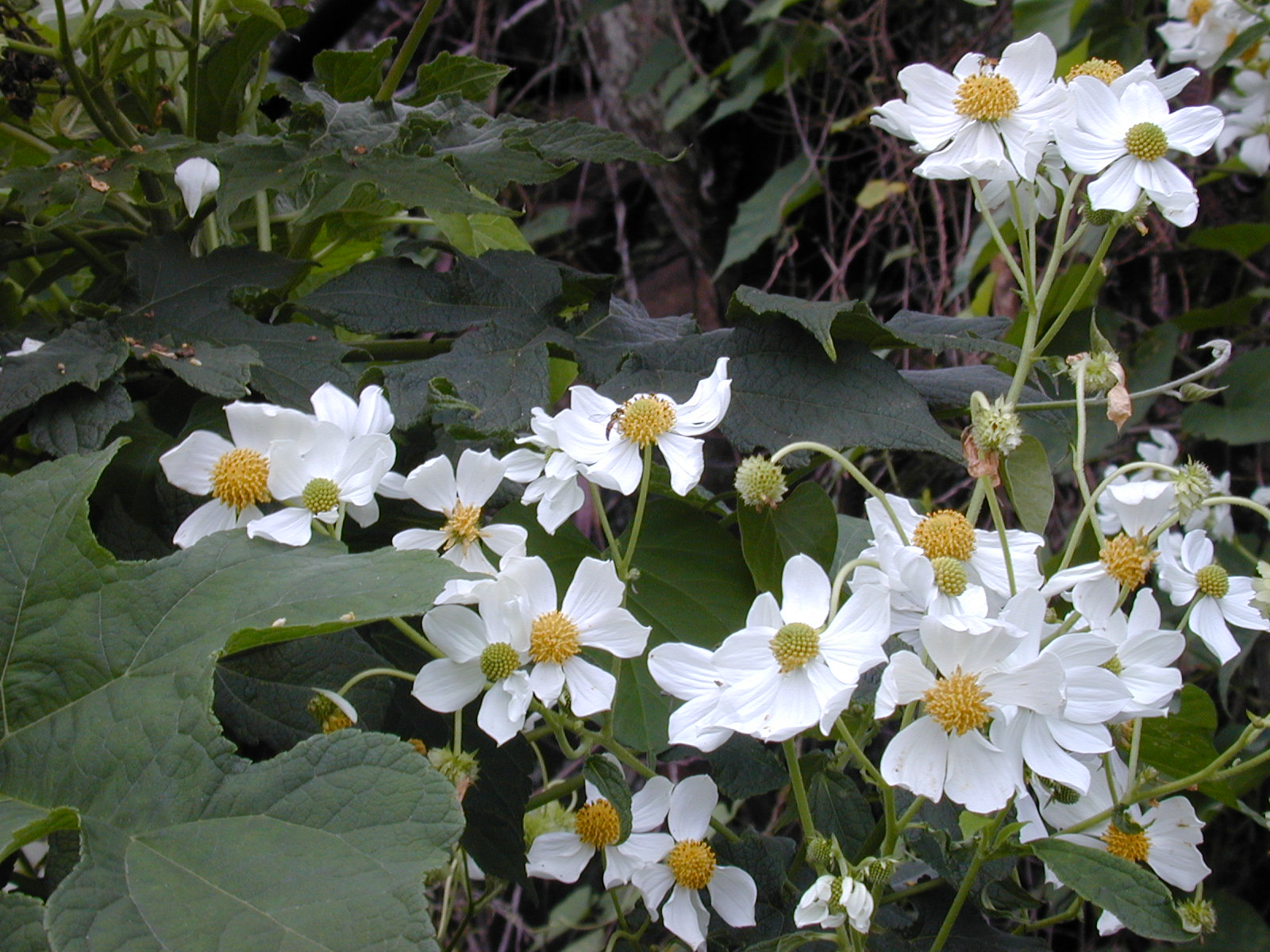
- In Hawaii
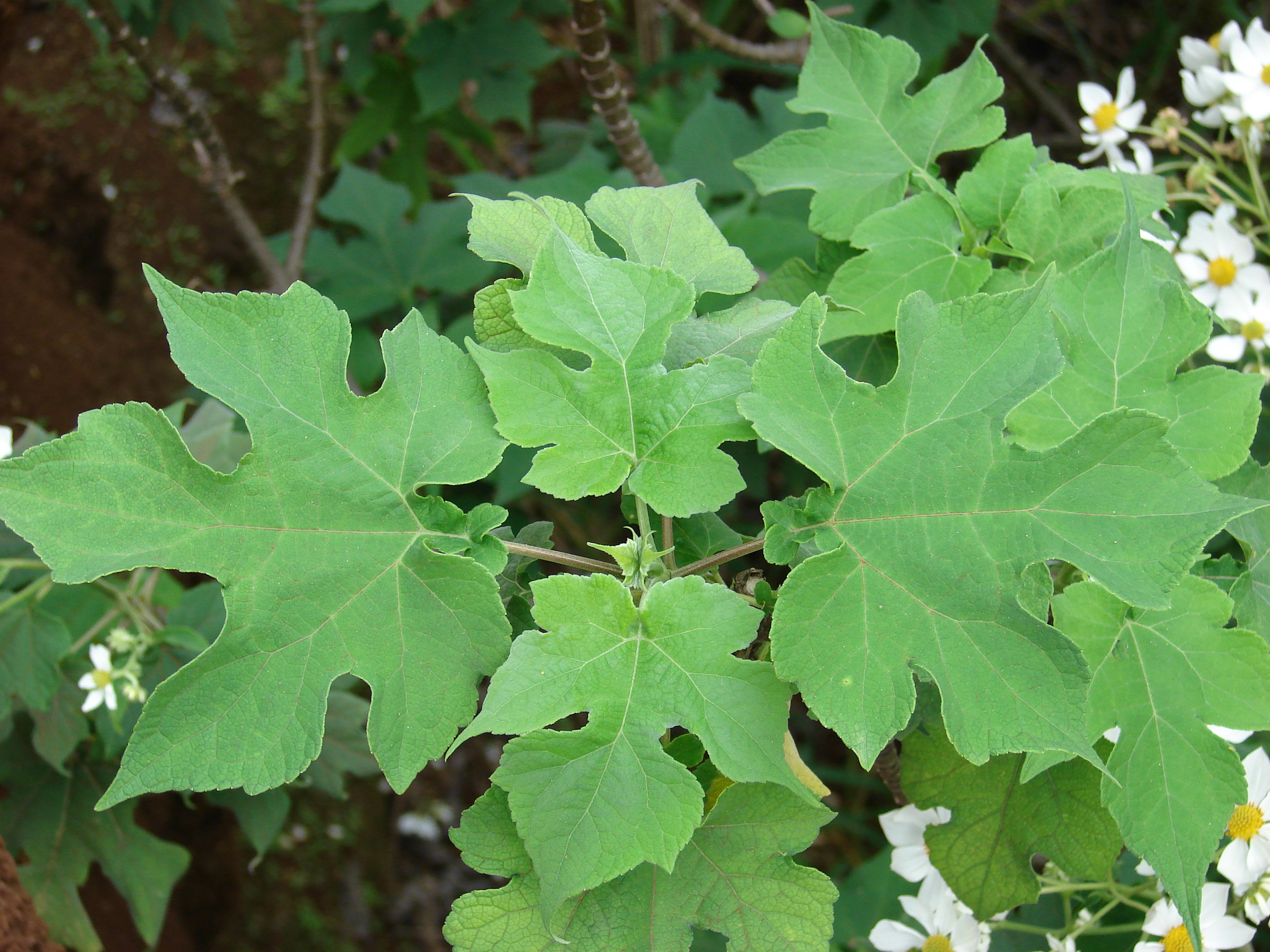
- Leaves

Scientific classification
- Kingdom: Plantae
- Clade: Tracheophytes
- Clade: Angiosperms
- Clade: Eudicots
- Clade: Asterids
- Order: Asterales
- Family: Asteraceae
- Genus: Montanoa
- Species: M. hibiscifolia

Binomial name
- Montanoa hibiscifolia Benth.

Synonyms
- Eriocoma hibiscifolia (Benth.) Kuntze; Montanoa pittieri B.L.Rob. & Greenm.; Montanoa samalensis J.M.Coult.; Montanoa wercklei A.Berger

= Montanoa hibiscifolia =

Species of plant

Montanoa hibiscifolia, the tree daisy or Anzac-flower, is a species of flowering plant in the family Asteraceae. It is native to Central America and southern Mexico, and it has been introduced to other locations including South Africa and Australia. An erect tree-like perennial reaching 6 m (20 ft), it is invasive, capable of forming dense stands.

== Description ==
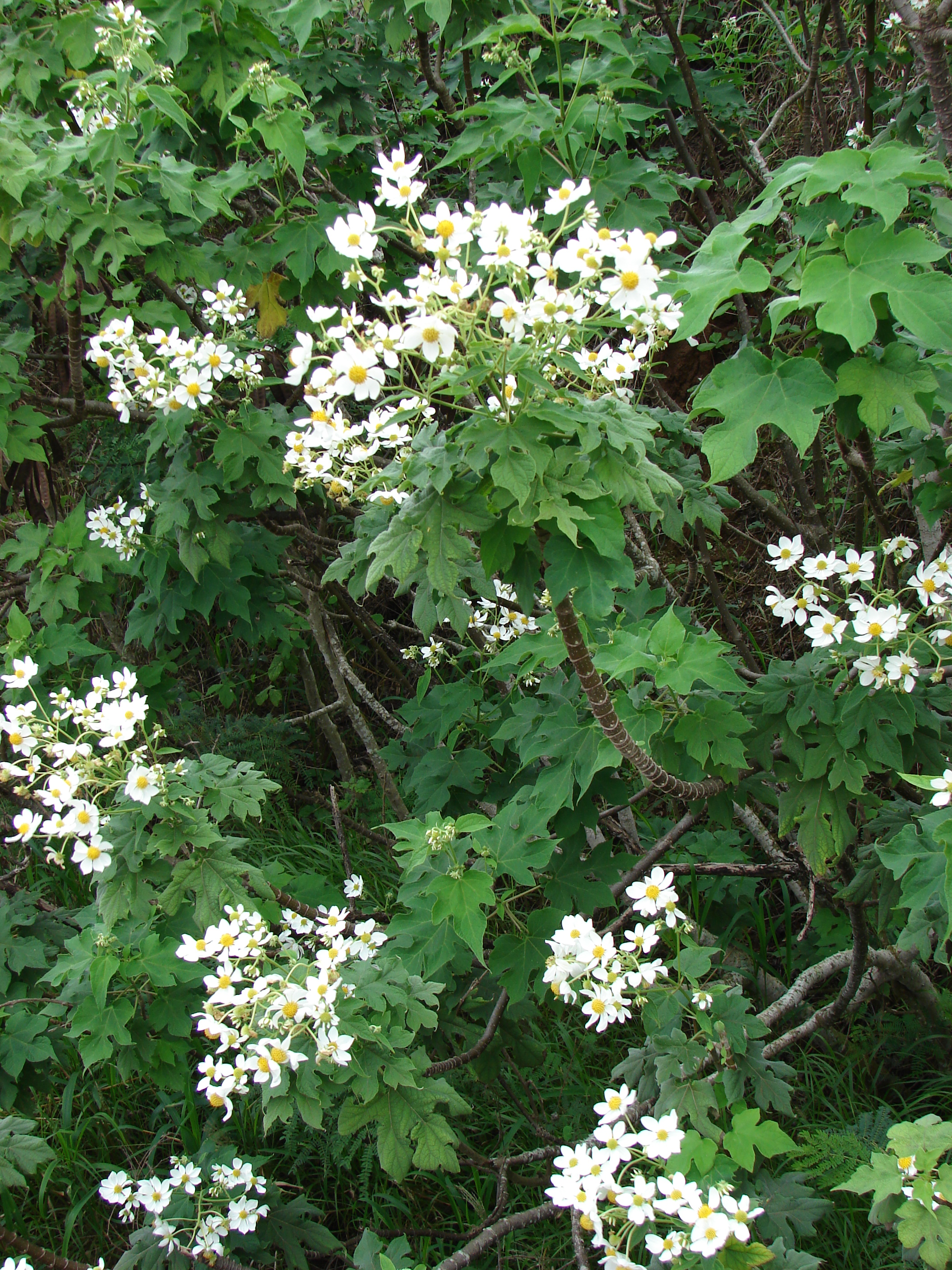
Shrub formation

It is an erect, tree-like, perennial shrub that is 2 to 7 m (7 to 23 ft) tall. Leaf arrangement is simple and their form is opposite. They are pinnatifid when young, and palmately lobed during maturity. The leaves are up to 25 cm (10 in) in length and width, dark green above and paler below, and smoothly hairy on both surfaces, with a pair of lobes at the base of the leaf blade.

=== Inflorescences ===
Daisy-like flowers, which appear from late autumn to winter, are approximately 4 cm (2 in) across. The ray petals or florets are white in color with a yellow disc. The flowers appear abundantly in terminal branched inflorescences. The disc florets are green but turn yellow. Reddish-brown dry fruits appear like old chartaceous flower heads, one-seeded, which do not open to release the seed.

== Distribution ==
It is native to Central America (Costa Rica, El Salvador, Guatemala, Honduras and Nicaragua) and southern Mexico, and it has been introduced to other locations including South Africa and Australia.

It has been cultivated as a garden plant, though it has since escaped cultivation and has become a weed at road verges, riparian zones, savannas, river banks, gullies and forest edges. It is invasive, capable of forming dense stands, and is therefore listed as a noxious weed in places such as South Africa and Hawaii, in addition to being a sleeper weed in southeastern Queensland. It has been naturalized in Norfolk Island, La Reunion, the coastal districts of northern New South Wales, and French Polynesia.

Propagation and reproduction occurs chiefly from seeds, which are dispersed by travelling vehicles and waterflows.

== Gallery ==
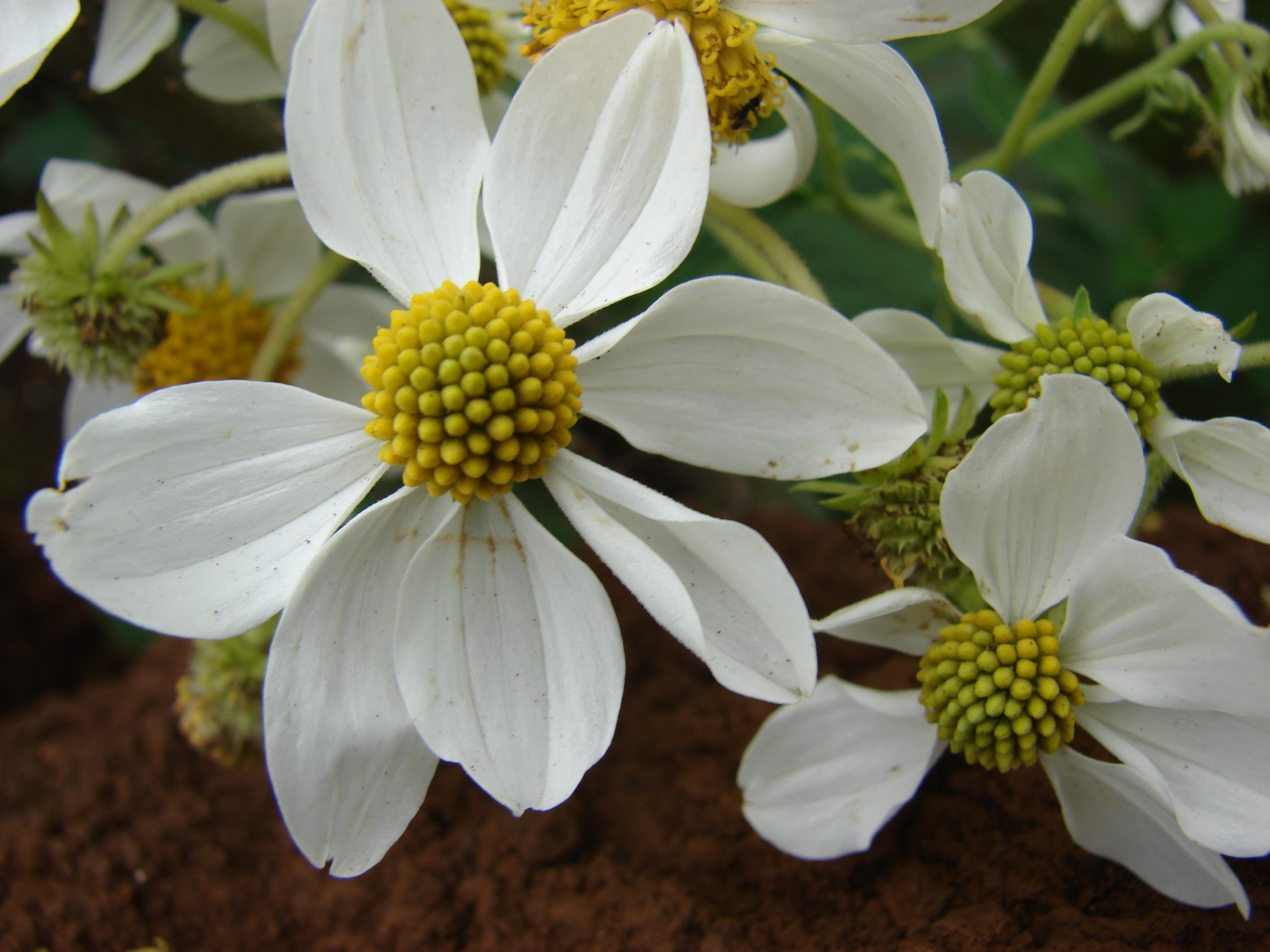
Close-up of flower

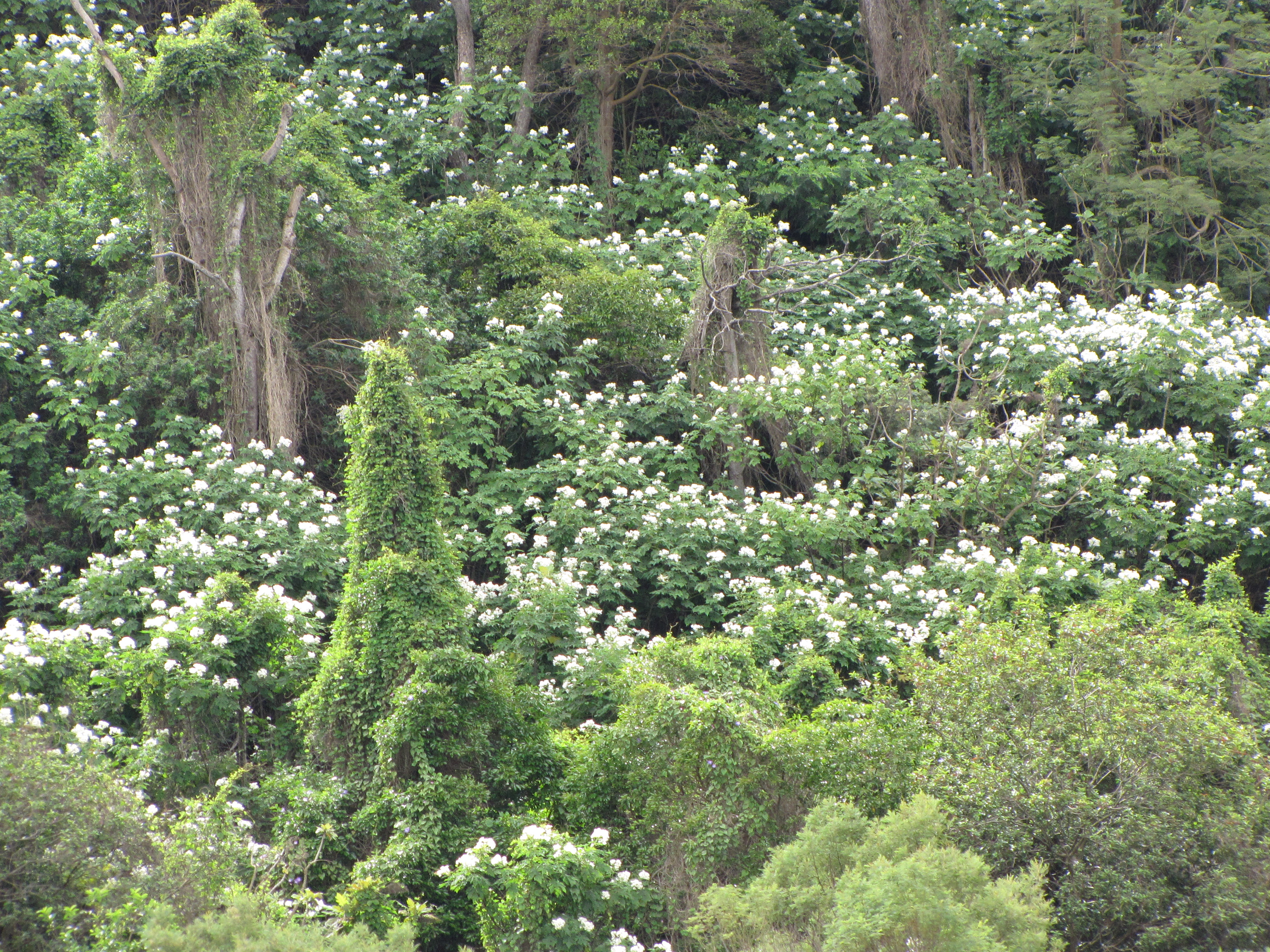
Infestation in Hawaii

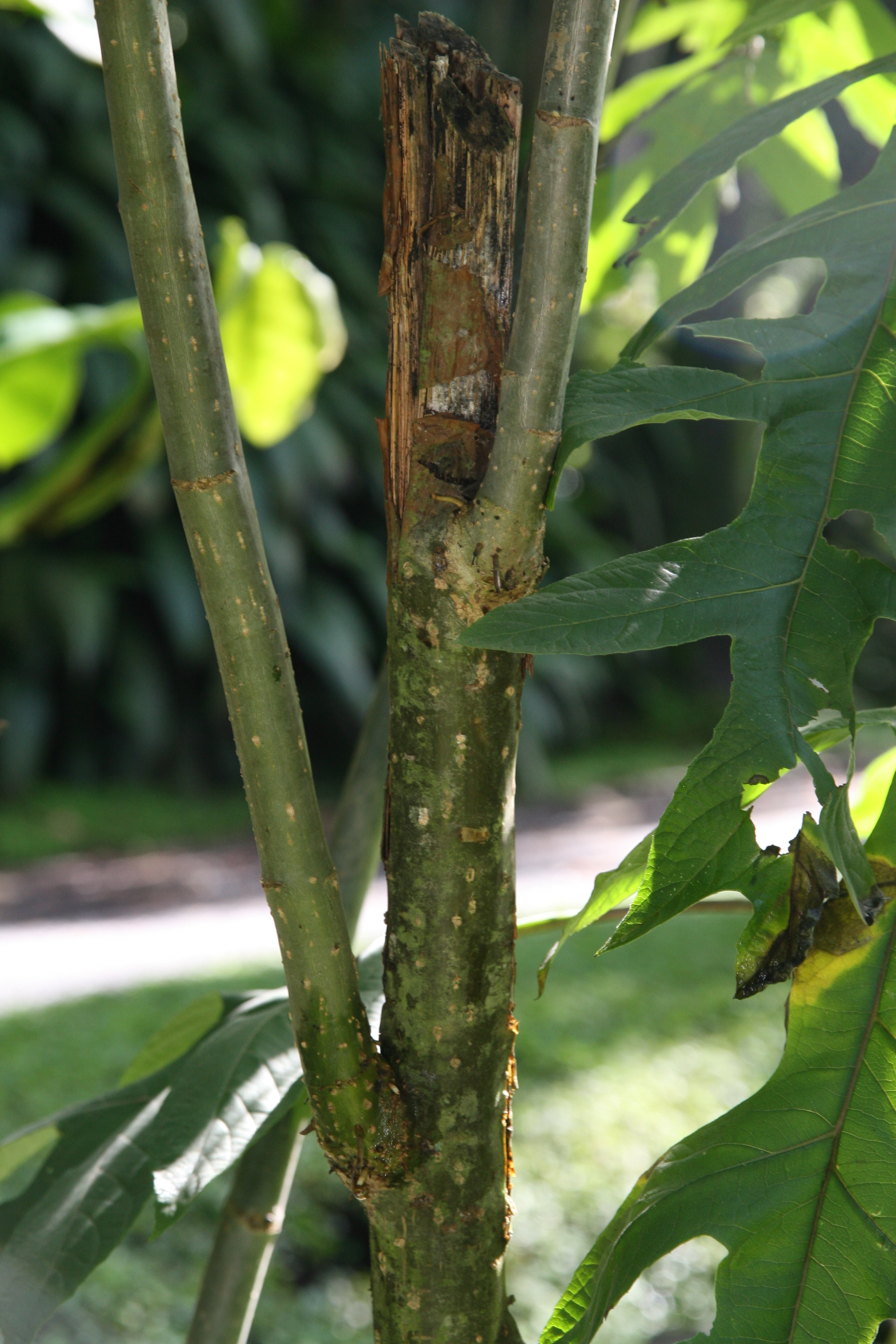
Stem

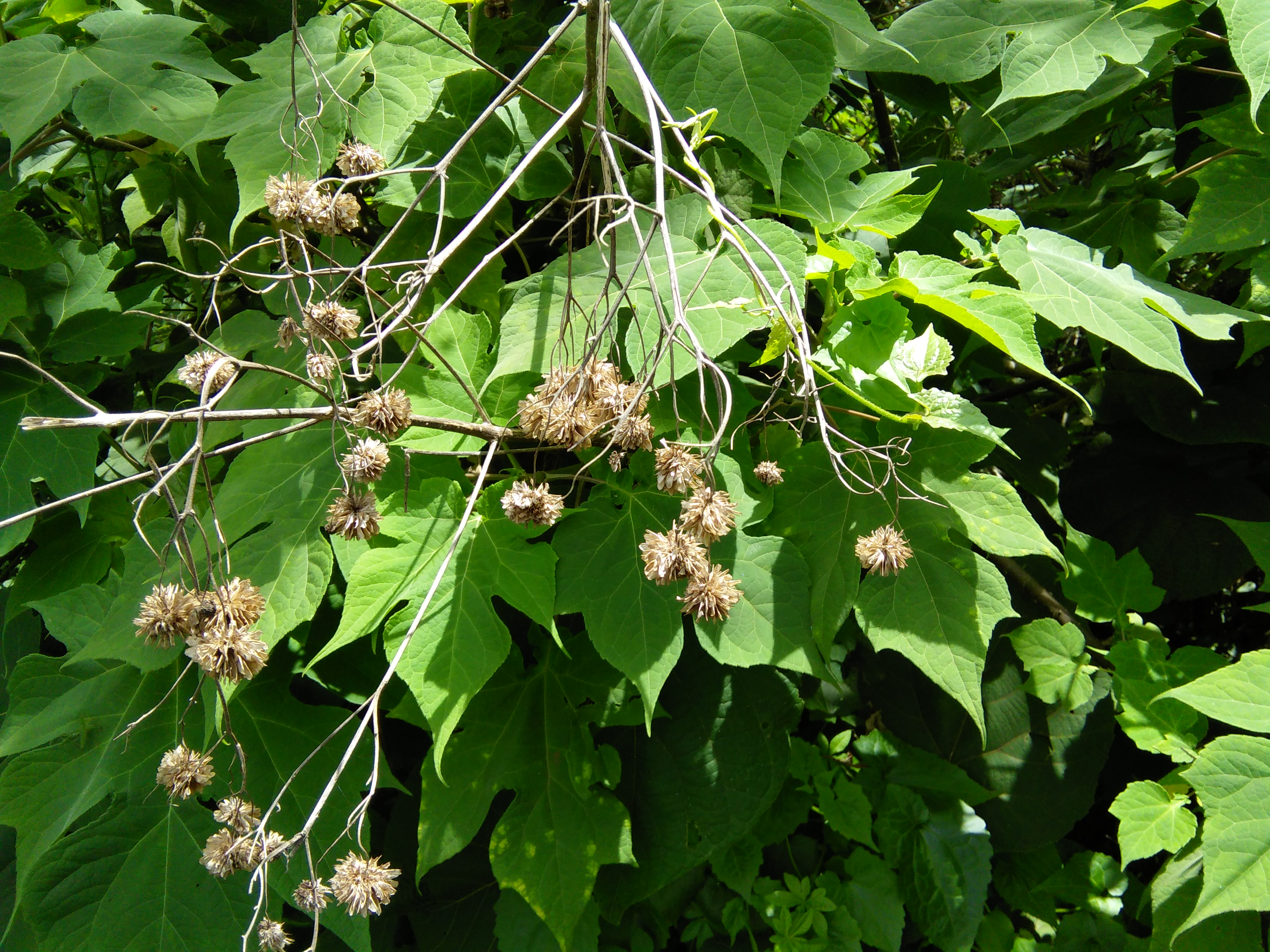
Gone to seed

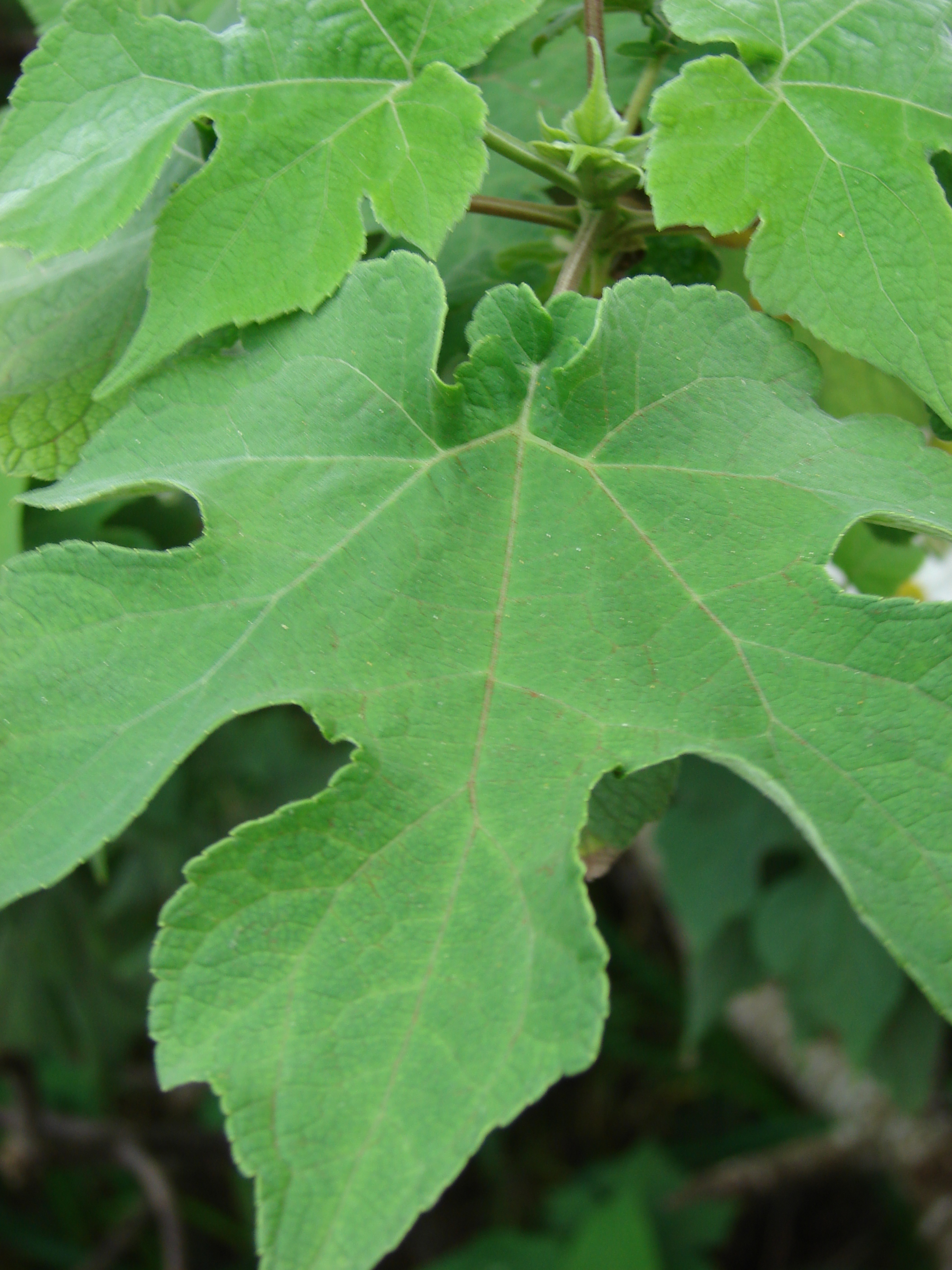
Leaf closeup

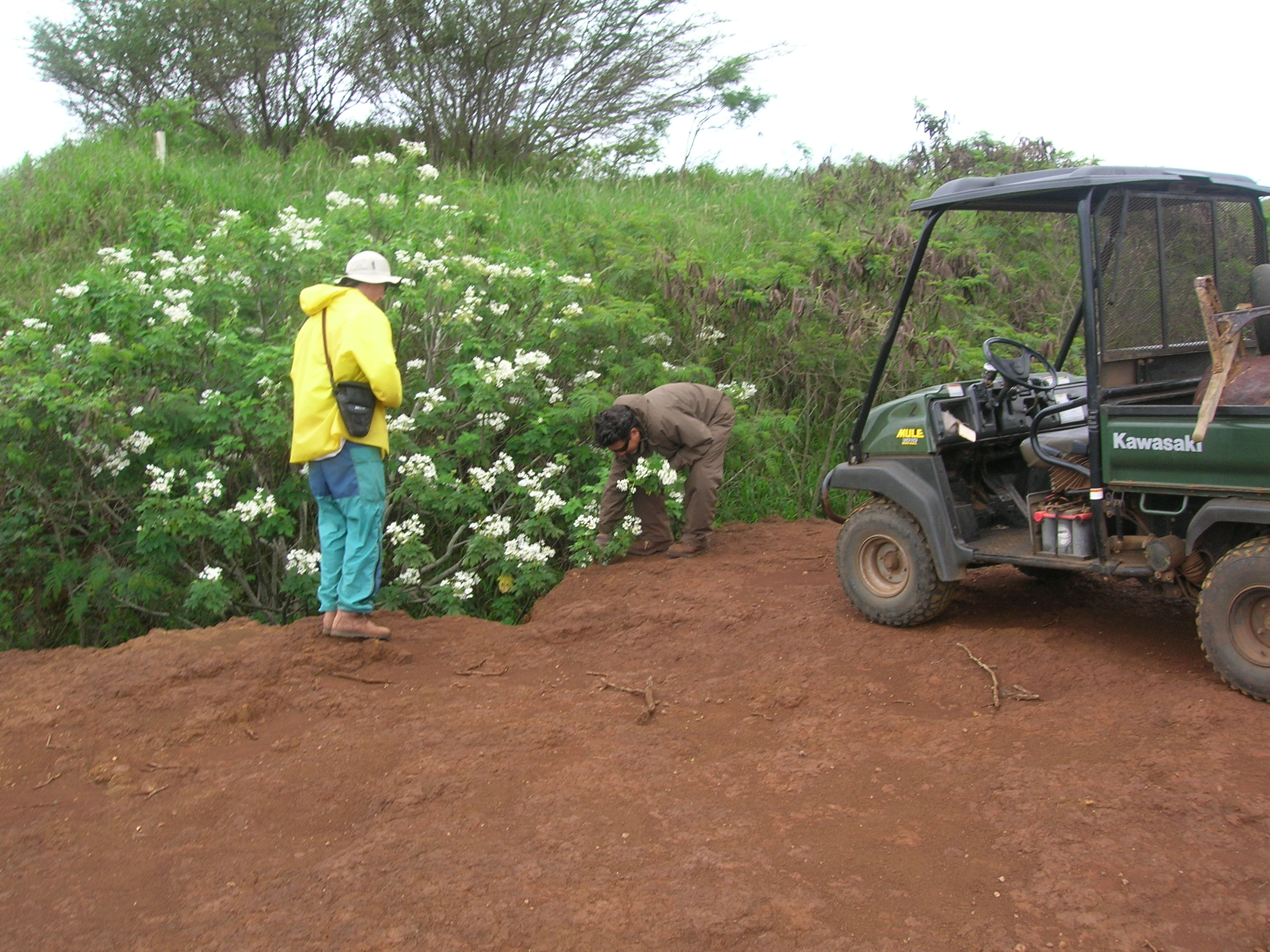
In a gorge in Hawaii

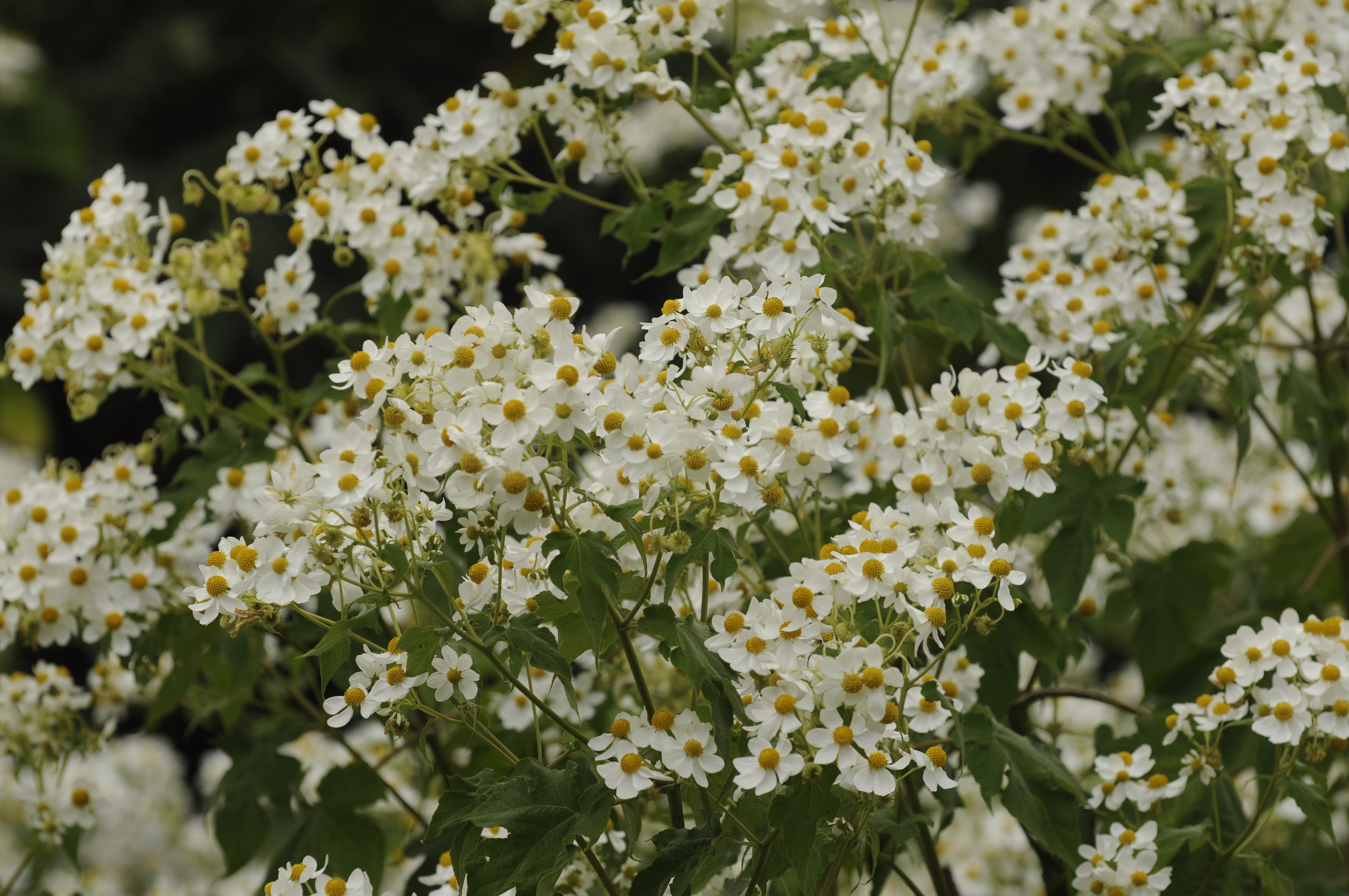
Flowering profusely in India
