= Curandero =

Traditional healer in Latin America and the United States

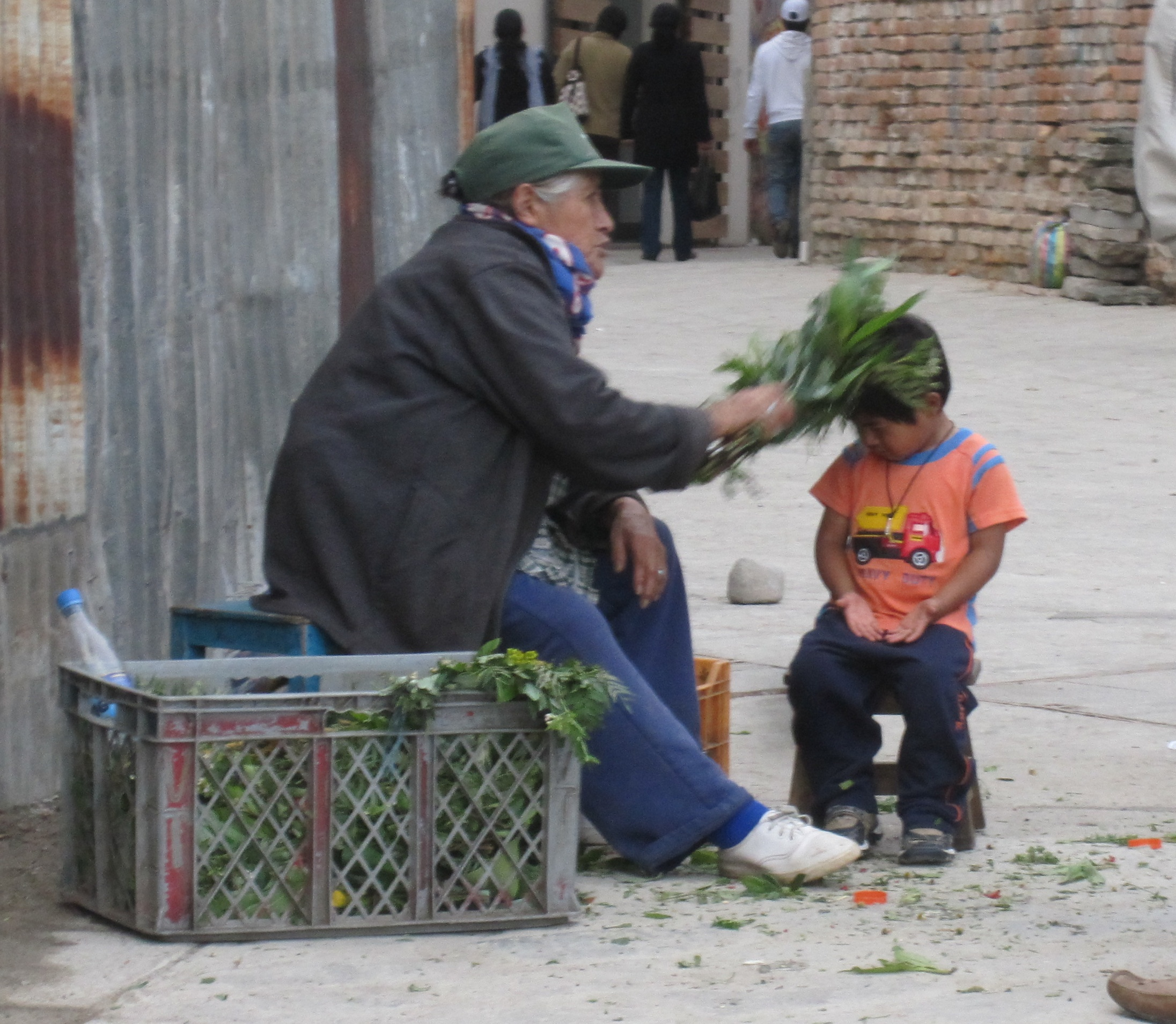
Curandera performing a limpieza in Cuenca, Ecuador

A curandero (Spanish: [kuɾanˈdeɾo], "healer"; f. curandera; also spelled curandeiro, Portuguese: [kuɾɐ̃ˈdejɾu], f. curandeira) is a traditional native healer or shaman found primarily in Latin America and also in the United States. A curandero is a specialist in traditional medicine whose practice (called curanderismo or curandeirismo) can either contrast with or supplement that of a practitioner of Western medicine. A curandero is claimed to administer shamanistic and spiritistic remedies for mental, emotional, physical and spiritual illnesses. Some curanderos, such as Don Pedrito, the Healer of Los Olmos, make use of simple herbs, waters, or mud to allegedly effect their cures. Others add Catholic elements, such as holy water and pictures of saints; San Martin de Porres for example is heavily employed within Peruvian curanderismo. The use of Catholic prayers and other borrowings and lendings is often found alongside native religious elements. Many curanderos emphasize their native spirituality in healing while being practicing Catholics. Still others, such as Maria Sabina, employ hallucinogenic media and many others use a combination of methods. Most of the concepts related to curanderismo are Spanish words, often with medieval, vernacular definitions.

In Spanish, actually, "curandero" is the direct translation for the English "healer" or "witch doctor", and it is a word that can be applied to healers over the world.

== History in Latin America ==
=== Origins of the term "curandero" ===
The term curandero can be traced back to the Spanish colonization of Latin America. Curanderos are the result of the mixture of traditional Indigenous medicinal practices and Catholic rituals. Curandero/a comes from the root curar in Spanish which translates to cure. Thus, a curandero/a is a healer. Understandings of medicine and curing in Spanish America came from multiple different cultures, including Mesoamerican, European, and African. As access to hospitals and licensed medical doctors was rare in Latin America, the population relied on local ideas about what could cause illness and what could cure it. To seek the help of a curandero was not unusual in Latin American society, despite the fact that the Inquisition kept a close eye on medical practitioners in colonial society. Females and males of different economic statuses, and different ethnic backgrounds, all employed curanderos.

=== The purpose of curanderos ===
The main purpose of a curandero/a is to treat illnesses that Western biological medicine has no direct role in. The conditions of these illnesses are embedded in the cultural and religious belief systems of the Natives of Mexico, and modern Latin America. Each treatment for these illnesses focuses on the cleansing, or retrieval, of an individual's spiritual and physical energy. The treatments combine elements of the Catholic religion, spiritual rituals, and the addition of medicinal herbs that are used to target illnesses that are emotional, spiritual, and physical.

The ailments that curanderos cure include blindness, stomach sicknesses, toothaches, dropsy (hidropesia), and supernatural illnesses. A curandero is a male healer, and a curandera is a female one. Historian Martha Few found records of male curanderos called "curandero sangradores" who were bloodletters. Martha Few also documented the account of Felipa de Xérez, a woman who had been blinded, regarding her interactions with a colonial Guatemalan curandera, María García, who had made a reputation in her town in as a successful healer. Reputation was important for a successful curandera. Female healers depended on hearsay, word of mouth, and practicing cures in front of other people in order to build a successful reputation. Furthermore, some curanderas were known for having reputations for curing specific kinds of ailments. For example, Few describes how María García was known to specialize in healing illnesses caused by spellcasting.

=== Links to the supernatural ===
Curanderos go beyond Western medicine, at times linking illness with spells, sorcery, god, or evil spirits. Mesoamerican culture believed the causes of illness to be binary, either natural or supernatural. These supernatural origins could be fright (susto), evil air or winds (mal aire), or aggressive sorcery. Because of this supernatural understanding of illness and the religious influence of the Catholic Inquisition, female folk healers were often conflated with brujas (witches). The Inquisition found such accusations to be plausible and worrisome as evidenced by the records of officials pursuing criminal cases against curanderas. The Inquisition was mostly concerned with the supernatural aspect of healers rather than the botanical or medicinal remedies that were used. In the case of María Garcia, the Inquisition's investigation into her began because of accusations from female residents in her community who alleged her to be practicing sorcery and accessing the supernatural.

=== Gossip and the inquisition ===
It was not unusual for the Inquisition to rely on gossip, even from unofficial sources, as reason to investigate a curandera. Gossip surrounding curanderas actively legitimized their powers in the community and enhanced their reputations, but this attention also drew the notice of colonial authorities. Community gossip "interacted and intersected" with colonial authorities. Tipped off by the gossip, officials searched and collected accounts, and used them in official records of the Inquisition court. Gossip in the community had two roles, functioning as a double-edged sword. It both legitimized women's power and provided the basis for their arrest.

== History in the United States ==
Historically, in the United States, curanderos were only found in concentrated Amerindian populations. It was largely thought that curanderos mainly practiced in New Mexico and along the Mexico–United States border. However, recent historical research shows that the practice of curanderismo (traditional healing) was not restricted to the American Southwest. The practice of curanderismo was prevalent in the 1880s in Northeastern Tennessee.

In the mid- to late 1970s the rise in ethnic minority and immigrant populations grew in tandem with the public presence of curanderos in areas outside of the historical geographic regions of the United States which had large Indigenous populations. Since the 1990s, it has become more commonplace to see curanderos in northern-tier cities in the United States.

== Types of curanderos ==
There are many different types of curanderos. Yerberos are primarily herbalists. Hueseros are bone and muscle therapists who emphasize physical ailments. Parteras are midwives. Oracionistas work primarily through the power of prayer. Other types include sobadors, who are masseurs, and brujos or brujas, who are witch doctors.

Among these broader terms, there are several subspecialties. For instance, yerberos who work primarily with tobacco to heal patients are known as tabaqueros. Healers who work primarily with ayahuasca are known as ayahuasqueros. Healers who work with peyote are known as peyoteros.

Although many curanderos do have a specialty and may identify with it, that does not mean that these healing modalities are necessarily strict and do not overlap. As an example, an oracionista may also be a yerbera, and so on.

== Practices of curanderos ==
Hispanics might seek out curanderos if the properties of their bodies are "hot" and "cold". Most of these practicing curanderos do not have formal medical training and inherit their gift or learn through being an apprentice. Often these faith healers have no office and work out of their homes. A significant factor why Hispanics seek out help from a curandero is because it is more affordable. Western medicine can often be more expensive, and some Hispanic families do not have the resources needed to be able to pay for them. Depending on the curandero, they might not charge for their services or just ask for a small offering or fee. You can find them in Hispanic communities to allow the members more accessibility to their services. Other reasons these communities might seek out services offered by curanderos are the language barrier and their immigration status. Curanderos are found in Spanish communities and can communicate better about their diagnoses and treatment. Unlike hospitals or healthcare workers that might have difficulty with a language barrier and complex medical terminology.

Communicating correctly with patients is challenging without an interpreter. Additionally, for immigrants, it can be challenging to get health care from government support, especially for those who are undocumented. In thiss case, services can be paid for in cash, which creates less fear of getting an immigration status reported.

Curanderos and at-home remedies come as an advantage to these individuals if they cannot pay cash but will do so if things get severe and do not better with other remedies first. Considering that these practices align more with Hispanic cultural views and beliefs, many of these individuals used curanderos and traditional medicine or alternative medicine in their home country. It can also be seen as a way of preserving these cultural views. Spiritual healing is another reason why curanderos might be sought out, and Hispanics feel that medical providers cannot help heal spiritual issues that the body might deal with.

Clients find that curanderos are healers of both the body and spirit. If needed, a curandero can cast out the evil spirits that might reside in someone's body and do a full spiritual cleanse. These are practices one will not find western medical providers performing or trying to achieve. It is found that most Hispanics who seek curanderos for their services are born in their home country as opposed to Hispanics born in the United States. Hispanics who are less integrated into life in the United States seek these healers to connect and feel familiar with their home countries' traditionalism. These Hispanic community members can be dissatisfied with diagnoses or Western medicine practices. They feel that their provider does not believe in their folk illnesses, much less know how to approach and treat them.

== Traditional illnesses and curses ==
Among some of the illnesses that curanderos treat are: espanto ("scare") or susto ("fright"); detaching or warding off vampiric espiritus (spirits); defending against or negating brujeria ("witchcraft" or "sorcery"), such as mal de ojo ("evil eye") or other ill intent; clearing illnesses associated with mal aire or mal viento ("evil air" or "evil wind"); treating mal projimo ("bad neighbor"), an illness caused by having negative thoughts or feelings towards another individual, or conversely, a group of people feeling negatively towards the patient being treated, both of which can lead to harm to the individual.

=== Consequences of encounters with duendes ===
A curandero can treat the negative consequences of encounters a person has had with a duende (a "spirit creature" such as a pixie, imp, fairy, leprechaun, brownie, dwarf, gnome, or troll). A duende can be a beneficial, neutral, or malicious spirit. Duendes are believed to live in the countryside of Latin American countries.

=== Effects of mal aire or mal viento ===
Mal aire or mal viento is something invisible movements of the air are believed to cause. These can be defined as the result of "bad" or "evil" air or an illness caused by hot or cold air. For example, if a person is outside on a hot day but enters a much cooler building, they can catch an aire. This can also be caused by supernatural forces carried through the wind. Something can be caught by walking around or encountering places with bad energy. Examples of such places can be graveyards, abandoned houses, and other places where these "bad" forces reside. The harmful energy attaches itself to a person when such forces are encountered and can quickly take over their entire body. It is believed that this harmful energy can also result in the decaying of a person's internal organs and can be fatal if left untreated. Many other common symptoms of mal aire include headaches, nausea, fatigue, diarrhea, and paleness.

=== Soul loss ===
A person can "lose their soul" (also known as soul loss) when being frightened or having a traumatic experience. This is called espanto or susto. Usually susto has much milder symptoms, and children and babies are more prone to getting it. Examples of such traumas that can cause soul loss are having scary dreams, receiving devastating news, facing a wild animal, etc. Symptoms associated with this disease can be nausea, crying, bad dreams and insomnia.

For all of the illnesses mentioned above, a curandero can perform a mal limpieza ("purge of evil" or "cleansing of evil") in order to get rid of the "bad" and restore the client to health. Examples of materials used in these limpiezas are sugar, liquor, holy water, perfume, eggs, chickens, and Guinea pigs. Others include a dog's skull, a dove's blood, and a head from a doll, or some other power object. Limpieza can also be performed with plants. These magical plants can be helpful in cleaning houses as well. If a house has been abandoned or something terrible has happened in it, such as a sudden death or act of violence, a curandero will do a ritual that cleanses the home from all the mal ("evil"). Once a limpieza has occurred, the materials used in it are disposed of. Given that the mal has been transferred to them, they must be disposed of far from human inhabitants in order to prevent others being harmed.

== Further information ==
In the 21st century as the popularity of alternative medicines grow, some curanderos are concerned about the appropriation of these practices.

The Moche people of ancient Peru often depicted curanderos in their art.

In the Andes, one of the instruments of the curandero is the chonta, a lance carved from the chonta palm, Bactris gasipaes, thought to be imbued with magical powers. The palm grows only in the Amazon basin and is the object of a brisk commerce. The Jivaro people of the Amazon rainforest use the hardwood of the chonta to carve their spears. The shaman is also known as chonteador, and his most important wand is the chonta defensa; if he dies without disciples, the chonta is thrown, wrapped in rubands and weighted with stones, to the bottom of a lake with the belief that its power will reemerge when a new shaman will take office. The shamans also use wands of huatulco wood, Loxopterygium huasango.

== See also ==
- Aztec medicine
- Guillermo Arévalo
- Pablo Amaringo
- Carlos Castaneda
- Folk healer
- Kalku
- Machi (shaman)
- Maya medicine
- Medicine man
- Nganga
- María Sabina
- Plastic shaman
- Santería
- Shamanism
- Shipibo-Conibo people
- Witch doctor
