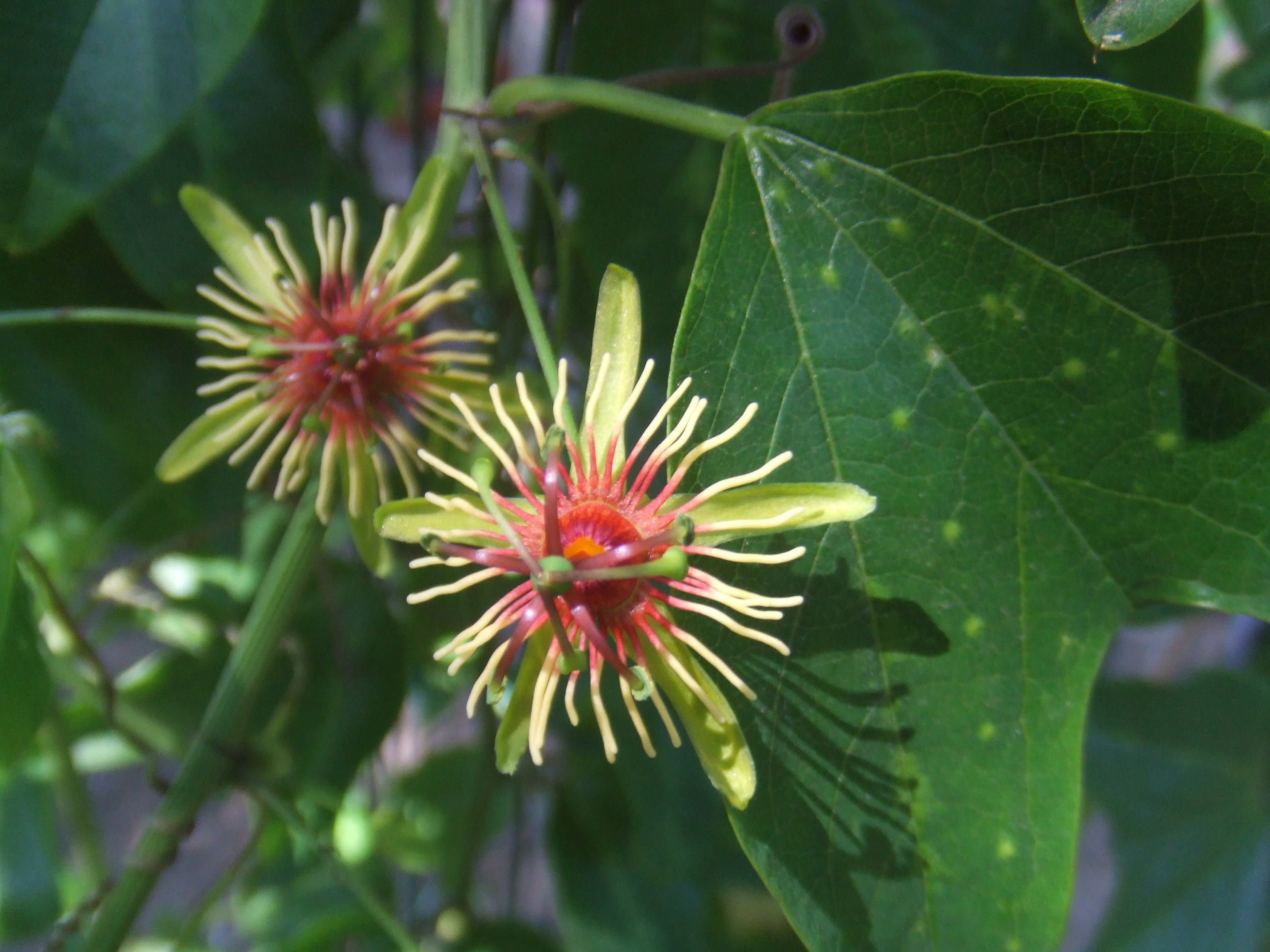

Scientific classification
- Kingdom: Plantae
- Clade: Embryophytes
- Clade: Tracheophytes
- Clade: Angiosperms
- Clade: Eudicots
- Clade: Rosids
- Order: Malpighiales
- Family: Passifloraceae
- Genus: Passiflora
- Species: P. jorullensis

Binomial name
- Passiflora jorullensis Kunth.

= Passiflora jorullensis =

Species of vine

Passiflora jorullensis is a species in the family Passifloraceae.
