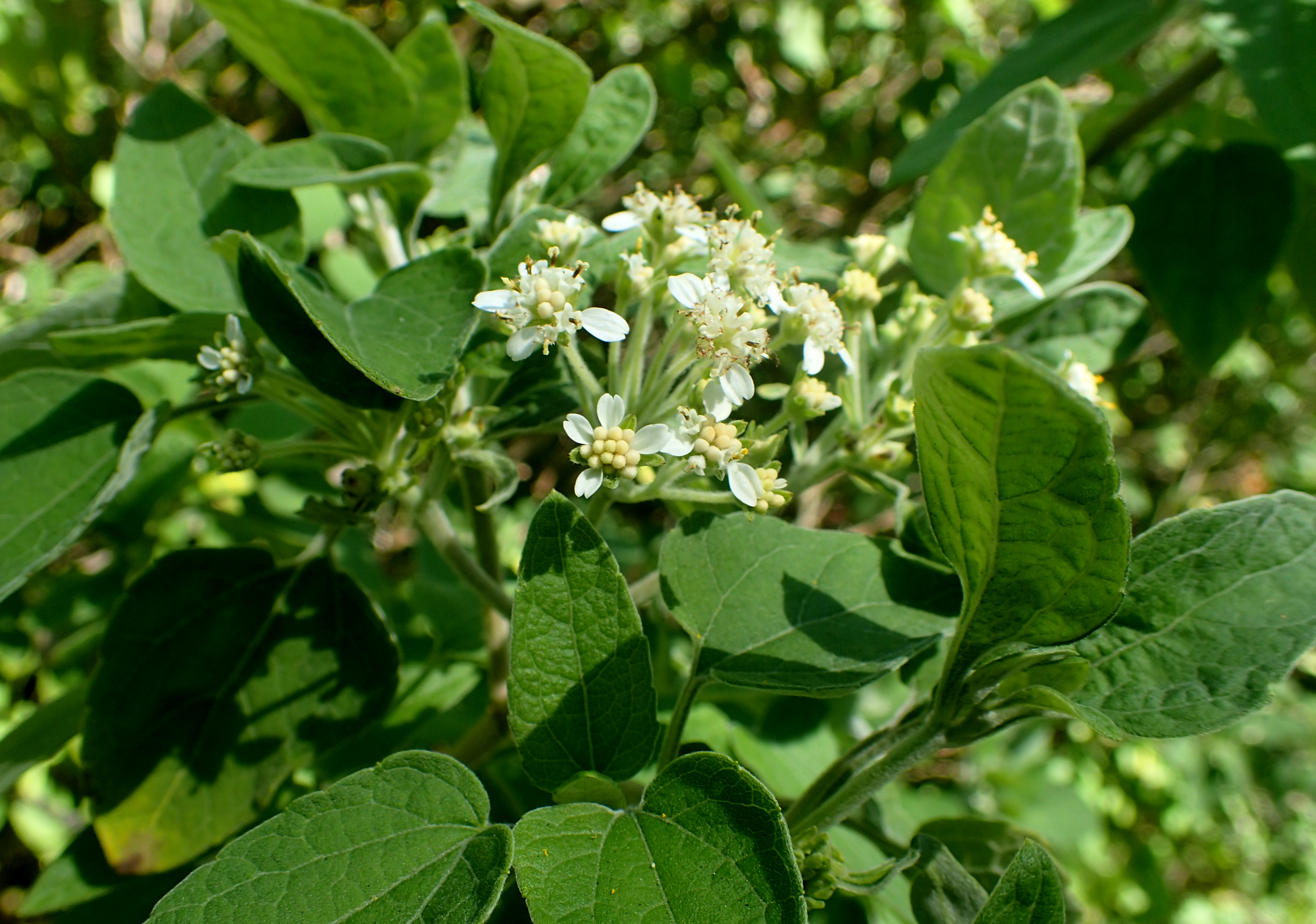
- Montanoa tomentosa var. xanthiifolia

Scientific classification
- Kingdom: Plantae
- Clade: Tracheophytes
- Clade: Angiosperms
- Clade: Eudicots
- Clade: Asterids
- Order: Asterales
- Family: Asteraceae
- Tribe: Heliantheae
- Genus: Montanoa
- Species: M. tomentosa

Binomial name
- Montanoa tomentosa Cerv.

= Montanoa tomentosa =

Species of flowering plant

Montanoa tomentosa is a species of flowering plant in the family Asteraceae which is native to Mexico and much of Central America. Its local common name is zoapatle. This small yellow-flowered shrub is best known for its use in traditional herbal medicine.

== Traditional medicine ==
In Mexico, there is a history of the use of M. tomentosa as a traditional remedy for sexual dysfunction. An extract of the leaves was also used to start uterine contractions to induce menstruation, abortion, and labor, and to slow postpartum bleeding. The related species Montanoa frutescens has similar effects in rats, but is much more likely to have contraceptive effects by causing structural changes in the endometrium.

At traditionally medicinally used amounts (75 mg/kg), M. tomentosa increased expression of sexual and mounting behavior in sexually active male rats and also in genitally anesthetized rats which were previously sexually inactive (noncopulators).
