= Plumbago pulchella =

Scientific classification
- Kingdom: Plantae
- Clade: Embryophytes
- Clade: Tracheophytes
- Clade: Angiosperms
- Clade: Eudicots
- Order: Caryophyllales
- Family: Plumbaginaceae
- Genus: Plumbago
- Species: P. pulchella

Binomial name
- Plumbago pulchella Boiss.

Species of flowering plant

Plumbago pulchella is a species of flowering plant in the Plumbaginaceae family. It is referred to by the common name cola de iguana.

The plant species is endemic to Mexico, where it is native to more than 20 states.

== Medicinal uses ==
Pulchellidin, an O-methylated anthocyanidin, can be found in Plumbago pulchella.

It is a traditional medicinal plant in Mesoamerica, including of the Rarámuri people in northwestern Mexico.

In Michoacán it is used as a veterinary medicine.
