= Coatlicue statue =

Aztec sculpture

Coatlicue
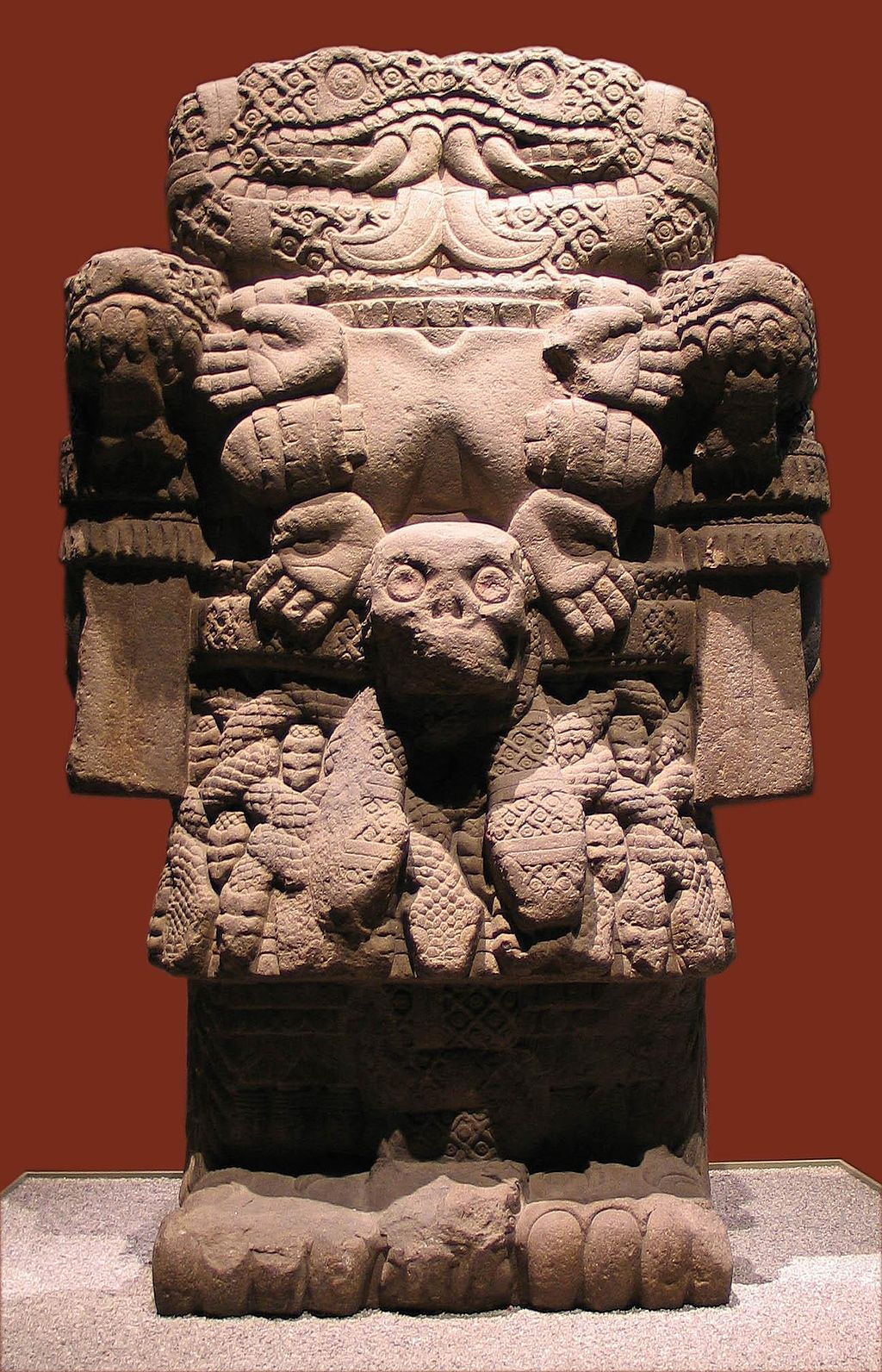
- The Coatlicue Statue on display in the National Museum of Anthropology
- Material: Andesite
- Height: 2.52 m
- Created: 1439 or 1491 (disputed)
- Discovered: 13 August 1790; Plaza del Zócalo, Mexico City
- Present location: National Museum of Anthropology, Mexico City
- Culture: Aztec

The Coatlicue statue is one of the most famous surviving Aztec sculptures. It is a 2.52 metre (8.3 ft) tall andesite statue by an unidentified Mexica artist. Although there are many debates about what or who the statue represents, it is usually identified as the Aztec deity Coatlicue ("Snakes-Her-Skirt"). It is currently located in the National Museum of Anthropology in Mexico City. Originally displayed in the Mexica city of Tenochtitlan, the monumental statue was buried after the 1521 Spanish conquest of the city, and it was excavated roughly 270 years later in 1790.

The statue was possibly completed in 1439 or 1491, although these dates are contested. Like many Aztec statues, it is carved in the round. Notably, it is also carved on its base with an image of the deity Tlaltecuhtli ("earth-lord"), despite the fact that the base would always be hidden from view. Similar statues and statuary fragments were discovered in the 20th century, leading scholars to debate the meaning of these works and their significance within the culture and ceremonies of the Aztec Empire.

== Burial, excavation and early interpretations ==
The Spanish conquest of Tenochtitlan in 1521 entailed house-to-house fighting between the Spanish, their indigenous allies, and the Aztecs, resulting in the destruction of much of the city. The Spanish invaders ordered the systematic destruction of what was left, including Mexica statues and buildings. They were particularly vehement about destroying religious objects and books, which the Spanish regarded as Satanic. The Coatlicue statue no doubt occupied a prominent position in Tenochtitlan. It is uncertain why it survived destruction and why it remains incredibly well-preserved, because fragments of similar statues are evidence of widespread destruction of such cult objects. Possibly, upon being ordered to destroy the work, the Mexica people instead buried it below the water table.

The Coatlicue statue was excavated in the main plaza of Mexico City in front of the National Palace on 13 August 1790 during the excavation of a water canal. A few months later, on 17 December 1790, the sun stone (also known as the "calendar stone") was found about 100 feet away. The momentous discovery of these two statues, along with the 1791 excavation of the Tizoc Stone, initiated a new phase of research on the Templo Mayor as contemporary scholars attempted to interpret their dense symbolism and decipher their meanings.

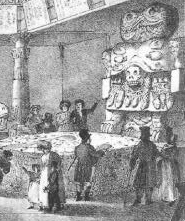
Bullock's cast of "Teoyamiqui", on display in London in 1824.

The first known scholar to study the statue after its excavation was Antonio de León y Gama, who identified the god depicted as "Teoyaomiqui", the deity of death and sacred war. The statue was identified as Coatlicue by Mexican archaeologist Alfredo Chavero in his book México á través de los siglos. Because of the carvings on the bottom of the statue, Léon y Gama believed the statue had originally been displayed at an angle, raised from the ground and supported by columns. He was incorrect, as the sculpture would have stood on its base. Aztec sculptures are generally carved in the round, despite the fact that all sides would not be visible at once.

In 1790, the statue had been moved to the National Autonomous University of Mexico to be preserved and studied, but it was soon buried on the orders of the clergy, because its presence resulted in worship, and they did not want to encourage adherence to Aztec religion, which the Spanish had spent centuries attempting to destroy. To prevent this, the statue was buried in the patio of the National Autonomous University of Mexico where it could not be seen. The statue was disinterred in 1803, so that Alexander von Humboldt could make drawings and a cast of it, after which it was reburied. It was again dug up for the final time in 1823, so that William Bullock could make another cast, which was displayed the next year in the Egyptian Hall in Piccadilly, London, as part of Bullock's Ancient Mexico exhibition. The statue remained on the patio at the university until the first National Museum was established.

== Visual description and iconography ==
The densely carved, colossal statue stands 8 feet tall and pitches forward, towering over its viewer and giving the impression that it is advancing forward. The front and back of the statue are bilaterally symmetrical. The annotated drawing below deciphers some of the statue's dense symbolism:

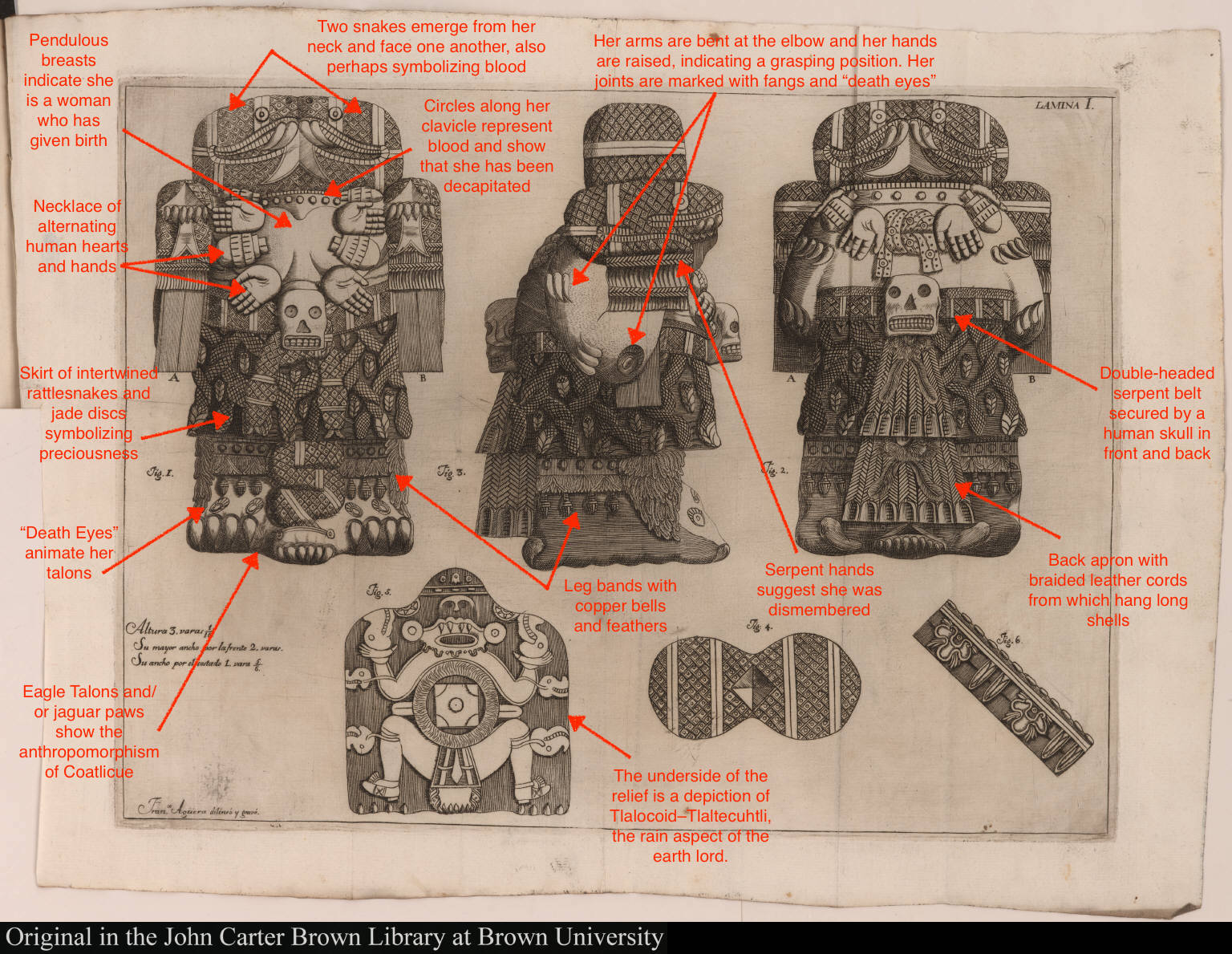
This drawing of the Aztec Coatlicue Statue by Antonio de Léon y Gama shows the work from all sides. The annotations help decipher some of the statue's dense symbolism.

== Comparable statues and contemporary debates ==
Another statue, called Yolotlicue ("heart-her-skirt"), was discovered in 1933. Though badly damaged, it is identical to Coatlicue except for having a skirt of hearts instead of snakes. As with the Coatlicue Statue, the bottom of Yolotlicue depicts Tlaltecuhtli and the year 12 Reed is inscribed between its shoulder blades. Two or more fragments of a similar statue or statues also exist, suggesting that these were part of a larger set. Reading the statues as part of a larger set, Elizabeth Boone has argued that the statues and fragments commonly identified as Coatlicues are actually Tzitzimime, female deities associated with the stars who would devour humans on earth if the sun were to fail.

The Coyolxauhqui Stone depicts the Aztec deity Coyolxauhqui who was the daughter of Coatlicue. In the usual telling of the myth, she was defeated and dismembered by her brother, the patron deity of the Aztecs, Huitzilopochtli, after she and her brothers had decapitated Coatlicue. The Coyolxauhqui stone was discovered at the base of the Templo Mayor in 1978. Like the images of Coatlicue and Yolotlicue (whose hands are cut off) in the statues and fragments, Coyolxauhqui is also decapitated and dismembered. Some scholars have related the dismemberment of the Tzitzimime to the dismemberment of Coyolxauhqui. If what is generally referred to as Coatlicue is actually one of the Tzitzimime, then Huitzilopochtli could have saved the human race by decapitating and dismembering them. Cecelia Klein argues that the Tzitzimime also have a positive role in Aztec myth, and that they are decapitated as a result of sacrificing themselves to put the sun in motion. These debates over the interpretation of the Coatlicue statue continue today.

Statue of Yolotlicue at the National Museum of Anthropology. The statue is identical to the Coatlicue Statue except for the skirt of hearts.	Fragment of a Coatlicue Statue at the National Museum of Anthropology. Fragments of other Coatlicue Statues show that the Coatlicue Statue in the National Museum of Anthropology is one of a larger set. In this image you can see part of a skirt of braided serpents.	Fragment of a Coatlicue Statue at the National Museum of Anthropology. In this fragment you can see part of a shell-tipped back panel.	Disk depicting a dismembered Coyolxāuhqui, which was found during construction in 1978 in Mexico City. Its discovery led to the excavation of the Huēyi Teōcalli.
