= Coyolxāuhqui =

Aztec goddess

- Goddess of the Moon
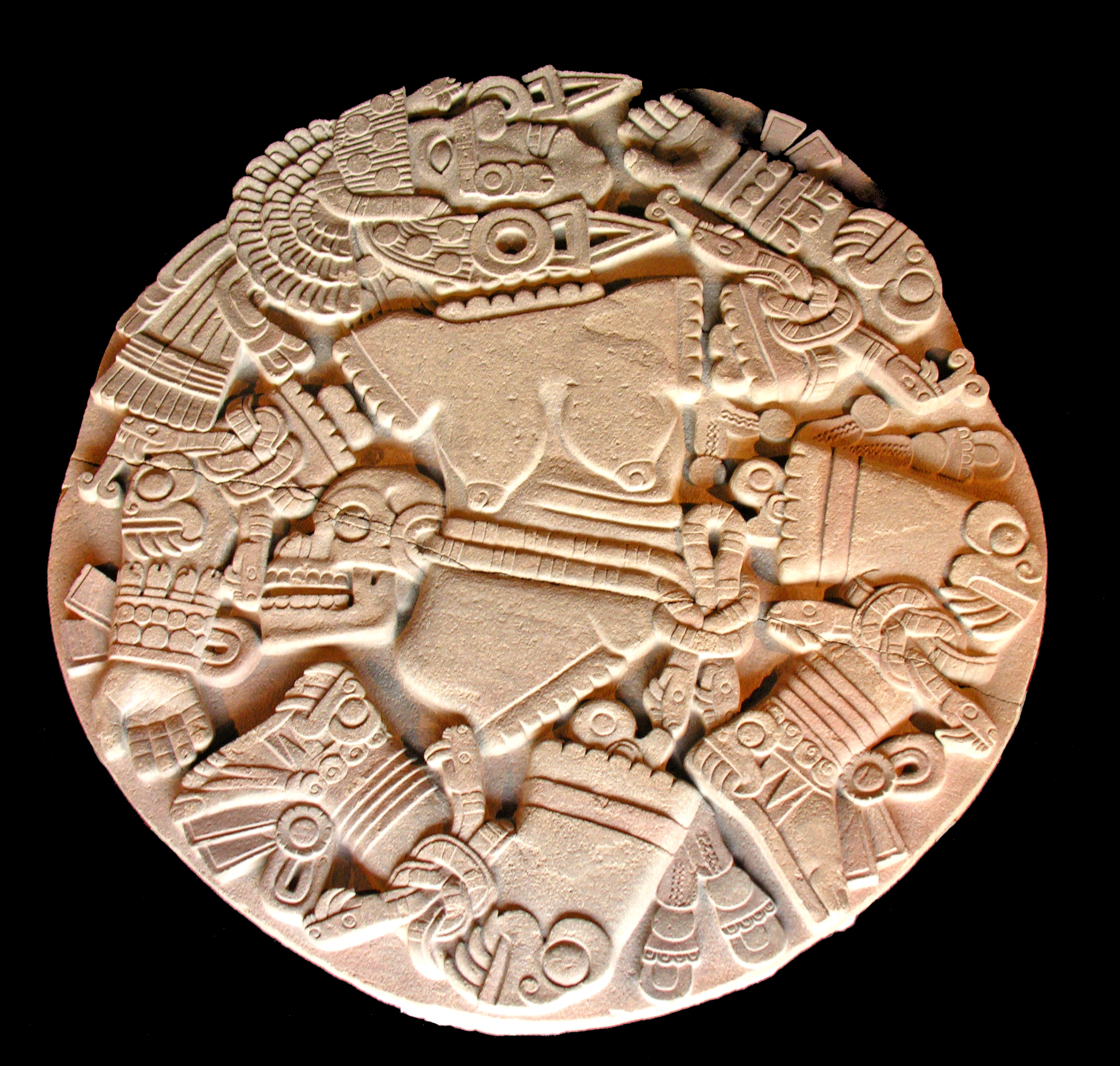
- Disk depicting a dismembered Coyolxāuhqui, which was found during construction in 1978 in Mexico City. Its discovery led to the excavation of the Huēyi Teōcalli.
- Planet: Moon
- Region: Mesoamerica
- Ethnic group: Aztec, Mexica (Nahua)

Genealogy
- Parents: Mixcoatl and Coatlicue (Codex Florentine)
- Siblings: • Huītzilōpōchtli and the Centzonhuītznāhua (Codex Florentine) • the Centzon Mimixcoa (Codex Ramirez)
- Consort: None

Equivalents
- Greek: Selene
- Maya: Maya moon goddess
- Chinese: Chang'e
- Otomi: Zäna

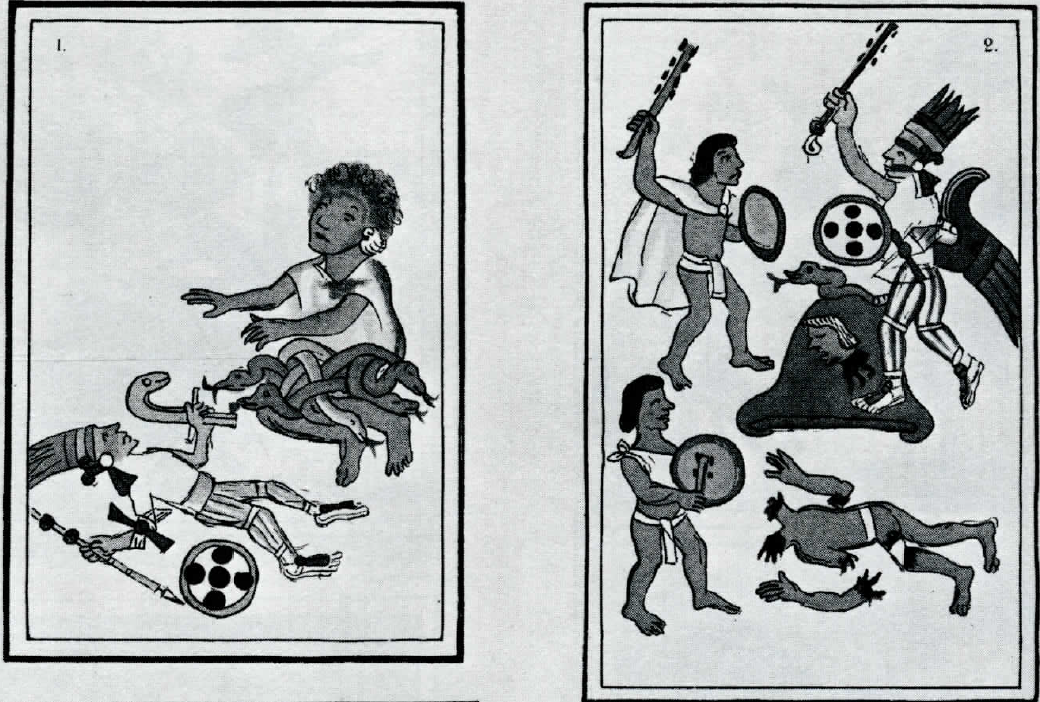
Huītzilōpōchtli springs from Coatlicue's womb fully armed and defends himself and his mother against Coyolxāuhqui. He dismembers his sister and fights his 400 brothers, the Centzonhuītznāhua

In Aztec religion, Coyolxāuhqui (Nahuatl pronunciation: [kojoɬˈʃaːʍki], "Painted with Bells") is a daughter of the goddess Cōātlīcue ("Serpent Skirt"). She was the leader of her brothers, the Centzonhuītznāhua ("Four Hundred Huītznāhua"). She led her brothers in an attack against their mother, Cōātlīcue, when they learned she was pregnant, convinced she dishonored them all. The attack is thwarted by Coyolxāuhqui's other brother, Huītzilōpōchtli, the national deity of the Mexica.

In 1978, workers at an electric company accidentally discovered a large stone relief depicting Coyolxāuhqui in Mexico City. The discovery of the Coyolxāuhqui stone led to large-scale excavation, directed by Eduardo Matos Moctezuma, to unearth the Huēyi Teōcalli (Templo Mayor in Spanish). The prominent position of the Coyolxāuhqui stone suggests the importance of her defeat by the Centzonhuītznāhua in Aztec religion and national identity.

== Birth of Huītzilōpōchtli and Coyolxāuhqui's defeat at Coatepec ==
On the summit of Coatepec ("Serpent Mountain") sat a shrine for Coatlicue, the maternal Earth deity. One day, as she swept her shrine, a ball of hummingbird feathers fell from the sky. She "snatched them up; she placed them at her waist." Thus, she became pregnant with the deity Huītzilōpōchtli.

Her miraculous pregnancy embarrassed Coatlicue's other children, including her eldest daughter, Coyolxāuhqui. Hearing of her pregnancy, the Centzonhuītznāhua, led by Coyolxāuhqui, decided to kill Coatlicue. As they prepared for battle and gathered at the base of Coatepec, one of the Centzonhuītznāhua, Quauitlicac, warned Huītzilōpōchtli of the attack while he was in utero. Hearing of the attack, the pregnant Cōātlīcue miraculously gave birth to a fully grown and armed Huītzilōpōchtli who sprang from her womb, wielding "his shield, teueuelli, and his darts and his blue dart thrower, called xinatlatl."

Huītzilōpōchtli killed Coyolxāuhqui, beheading her and throwing her body down the side of Coatepec: "He pierced Coyolxauhqui, and then quickly struck off her head. It stopped there at the edge of Coatepetl. And her body came falling below; it fell breaking to pieces; in various places her arms, her legs, her body each fell." As for his brothers, the Centzonhuītznāhua, he scattered them in all directions from the top of Coatepec. He pursued them relentlessly, and those who escaped went south.

Some authors have written that Huītzilōpōchtli tossed Coyolxāuhqui's head into the sky, where it became the Moon, so that his mother would be comforted in seeing her daughter in the sky every night, and that her scattered brothers became the Southern Star deities. It is difficult to verify these variations of the narrative with 16th century sources.

=== Imagery in Poses ===
The Templo Mayor stone disk served as a cautionary sign to foes of Tenochtitlán. This is exemplified by the dismemberment of her body and its restraints.

The display of Coyolxāuhqui's severed head served this same purpose differently, as it was different than the typical full-body sculptures and art created by the Mexica.

=== Identifying Elements ===
Gold ornaments adorn the face of Coyolxāuhqui in the form of earrings and bell pendants. The ear ornaments have trapeze-ray signs symbolic of the tail of Xiuhcoatl, the fire serpent. This makes them identifiers as they create a direct tie to Huītzilōpōchtli, who used Xiuhcoatl as his weapon.

== Templo Mayor stone disk ==
=== Discovery ===
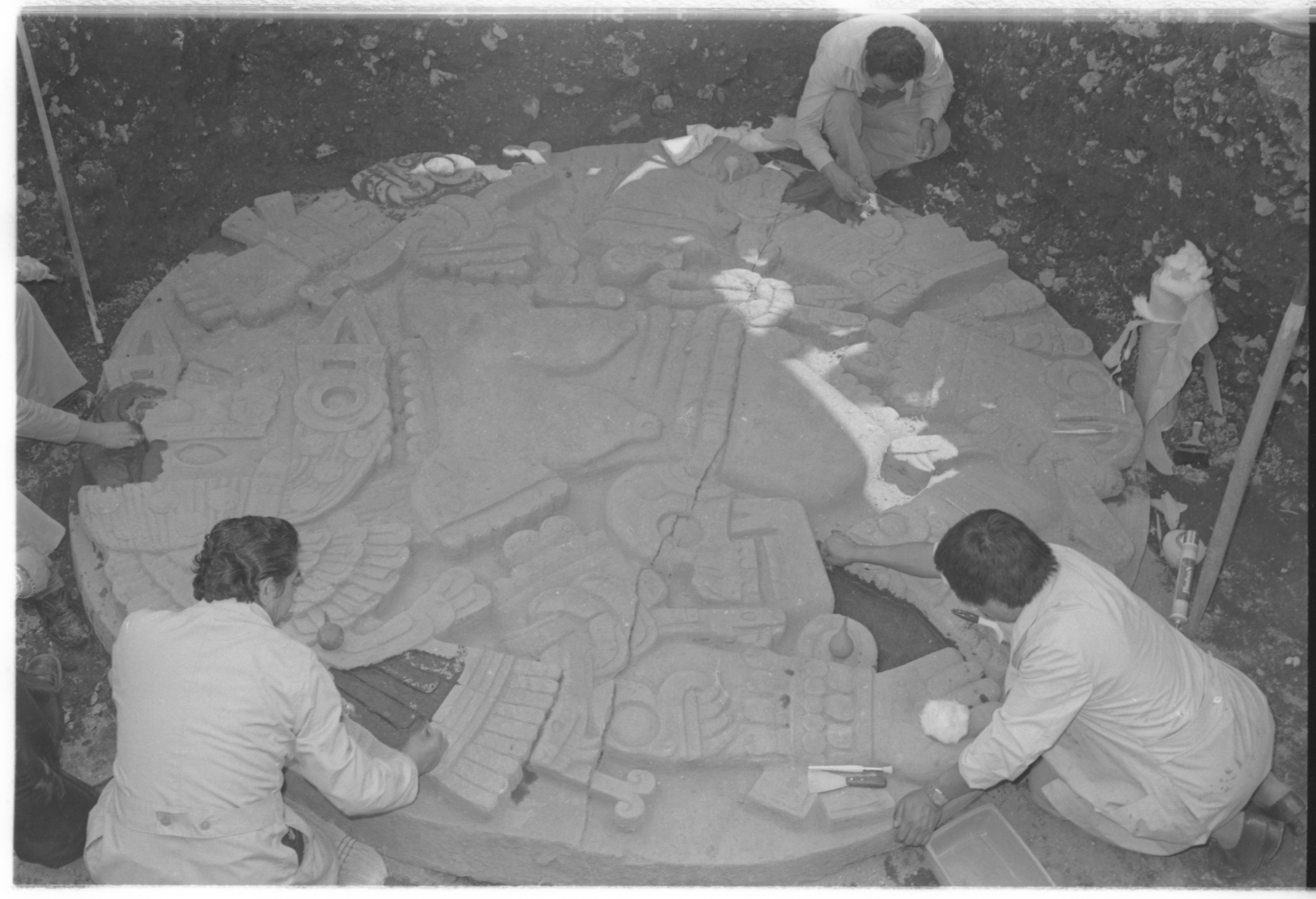
Archaeologists of the Instituto Nacional de Antropología e Historia working at the place were the stone was discovered, 1978.

On February 21, 1978, a group of workers for the Mexico City electric power company came across a large shield-shaped stone covered in reliefs while digging. The stone they uncovered depicts the narrative of Coyolxāuhqui's defeat at Coatepec, shown at left. The discovery renewed the interest in excavating the ancient city of Tenochtitlán underneath Mexico City. This led to the excavation of the Huēyi Teōcalli (Templo Mayor), directed by Eduardo Matos Moctezuma.

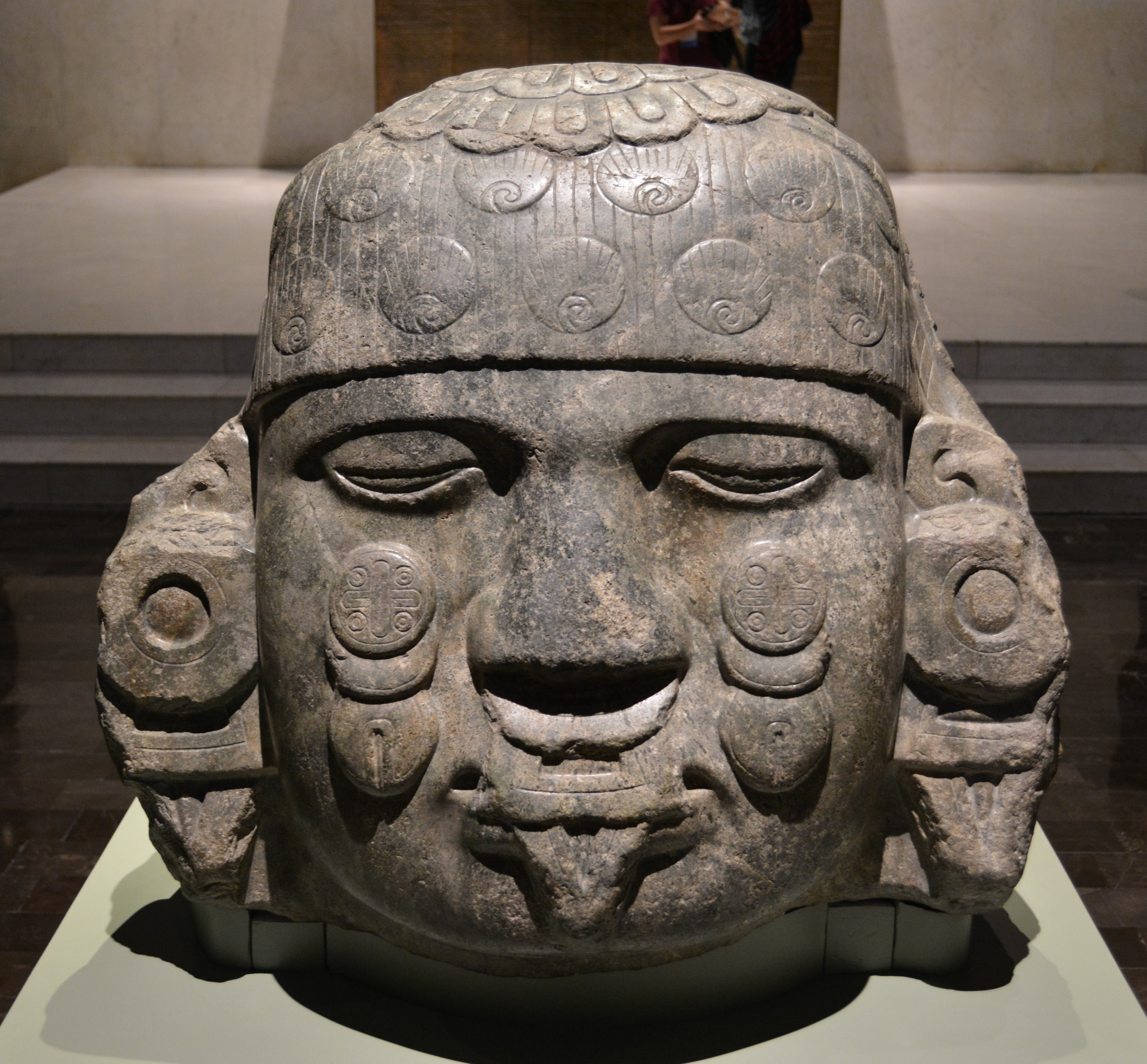
Head of Coyolxāuhqui; c. 1500; diorite; 80 cm × 80 cm × 65 cm (31 in × 31 in × 26 in); National Museum of Anthropology (Mexico City). As usual, she is shown decapitated and with closed eyelids, as her brother, Huitzilopochtli, beheaded her.

This relief is one of the best known Aztec monuments and one of the few great Aztec monuments to have been found fully in situ.

=== Location ===
The Coyolxāuhqui stone sat at the base of the stairs of the Huēyi Teōcalli, the primary temple of the Mexica in Tenochtitlan, on the side dedicated to Huitzilopochtli. The stone laid in the center of a platform that extended from the foot of the stairway. The temple is dedicated to Huītzilōpōchtli and the rain deity Tlāloc. Scholars believe that Mexica artists and builders incorporated images of the Coatepec narrative into the Huēyi Teōcalli during a major renovation from the years 4 Reed to 8 Reed (1483–1487) under the rule of Ahuitzotl.

Eduardo Matos Moctezuma first noted that the monument's placement at the bottom of the Templo Mayor commemorated the history of Huītzilōpōchtli defeating Coyolxāuhqui in the battle on Mount Coatepetel. Matos Moctezuma has argued that the section of the Huēyi Teōcalli dedicated to Huītzilōpōchtli represents the sacred mountain of Coatepec where Huītzilōpōchtli was born and Coyolxāuhqui died.

The Coyolxāuhqui stone was located in what was named Phase IV of the Templo Mayor during its excavation.

=== Creation ===
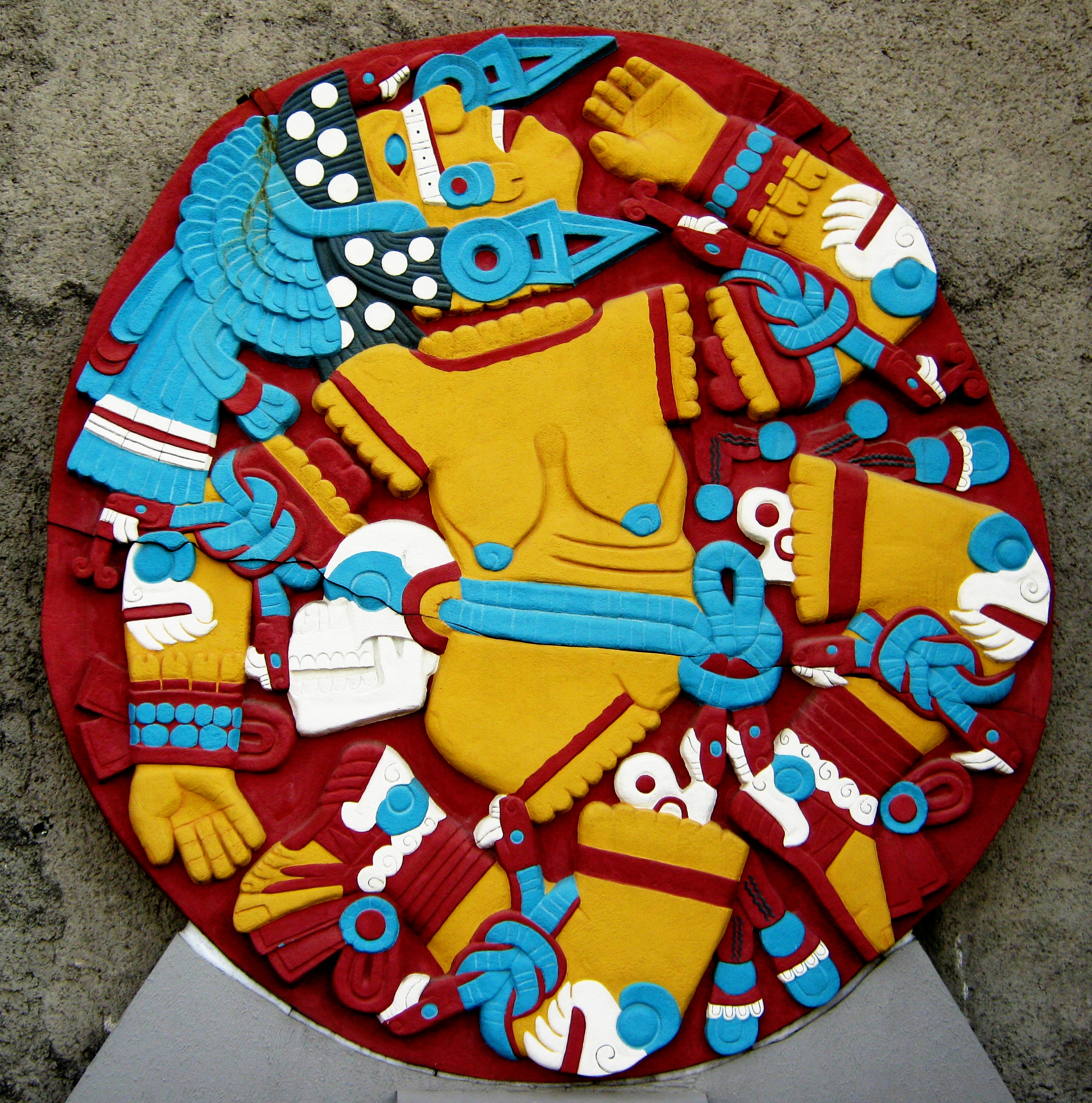
Original coloration of the stone disk, based on chemical traces of pigments.

The artist of the Coyolxāuhqui stone carved this disk in high relief out of a single large stone, 3.25 meters in diameter. Aztec historian Richard Townsend describes it as one of Mesoamerican art's most powerfully expressive sculptures, using "an assurance of design and a technical virtuosity not previously seen at the pyramids."

The stone was likely created under the rule of Axayacatl (1469–1481).

=== Imagery ===
On the disk, Coyolxāuhqui lies on her back, with her head, arms, and legs severed from her body. Her head faces upwards, away from her torso and in profile view, with her mouth open. Her dismembered torso lies flat on her back. Her breasts sag downward. Her body is neatly yet dynamically organized within the circular composition. Scallop-shaped carvings line the points of decapitation and dismemberment at her neck, shoulders, and hip joints. In this representation, Coyolxāuhqui is nearly naked, barring her serpent loincloth. She wears only the ritual attire of bells in her hair, a bell symbol on her cheek, and a feathered headdress. These objects identify her as Coyolxauhqui. She wears a skull tied to a belt of snakes around her waist and an ear tab showing the Mexica year sign. Snake, skull, and earth monster imagery surround her.

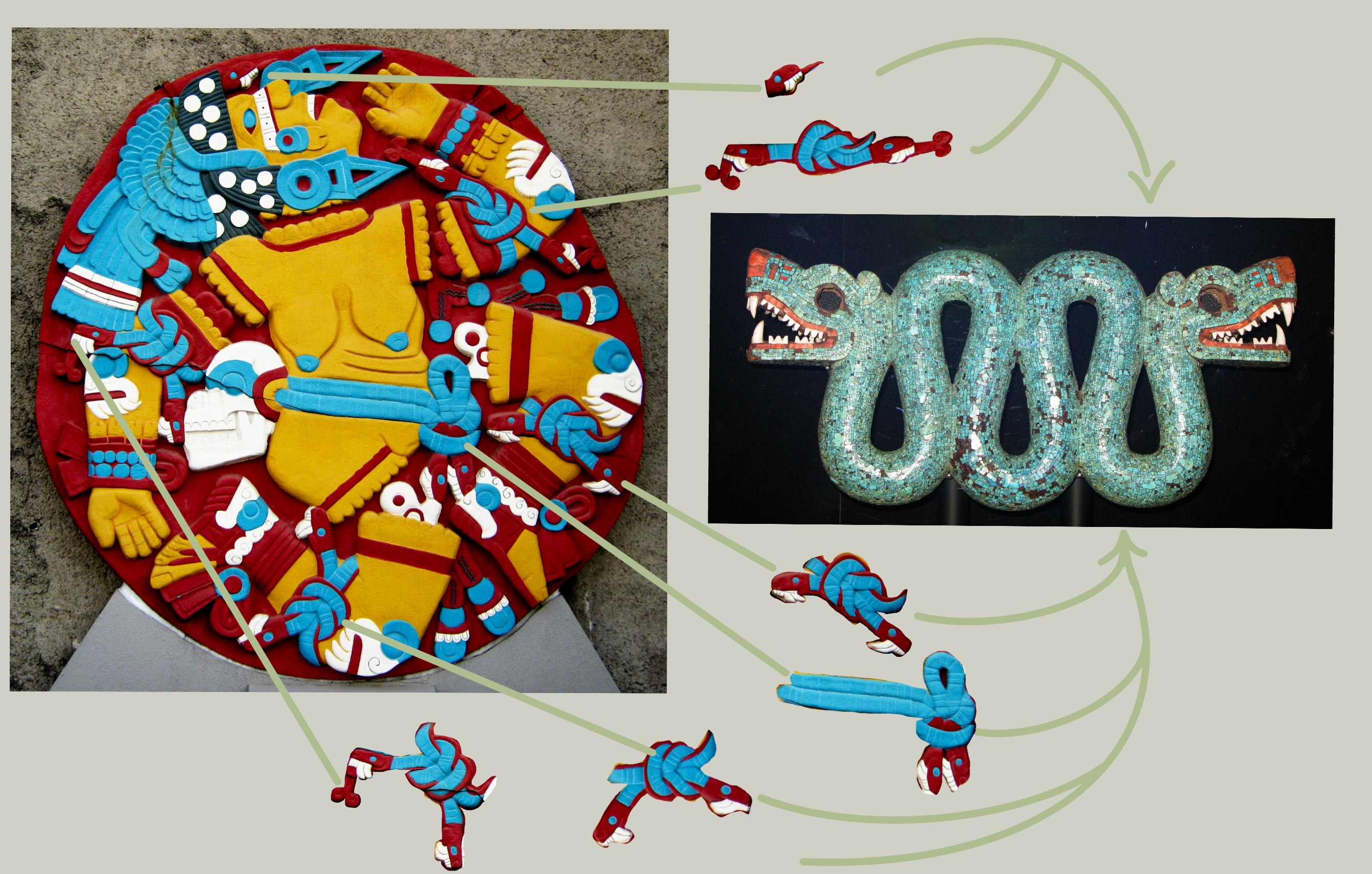
Double-headed serpents restraining the joints of Coyolxāuhqui next to reference of a double-headed serpent sculpture.

In the image to the right, which represents the original colors of the stone, Coyolxāuhqui's yellow body lies before a red background. Bright blue colors her headdress and various details in the carving. White bones emerge from the scalloped, dismembered body parts.

The double-headed serpent, also known as Maquizcoatl, were negative omens that could indicate death. Associated with Huītzilōpōchtli, as it was one of his names, creates a tie between the siblings. Coyolxāuhqui's joints being restrained by Maquizcoatl is both symbolic of her duty to serve a warning as well as identifying.

=== Uses ===
The Coyolxāuhqui stone would have served as a cautionary sign to the enemies of Tenochtitlán. According to Aztec history, female deities such as Coyolxāuhqui were the first Aztec enemies to die in war. In this, Coyolxāuhqui came to represent all conquered enemies. Her violent death was a warning for the fate of those who crossed the Mexica people. Richard Townsend notes that the disk represented the defeat of the Aztecs' enemies.

Sacrificial victims crossed this stone before walking up the stairs of the temple to the block in front of Huītzilōpōchtli's shrine.

== Role in sacrifice ==
Scholars also believe that the decapitation and destruction of Coyolxāuhqui are reflected in the pattern of the warrior ritual sacrifice, particularly during the feast of Panquetzaliztli (Banner Raising). The feast takes place in the 15th month of the Aztec calendar and is dedicated to Huītzilōpōchtli. During the ceremony, captives’ hearts were cut out and their bodies were thrown down the temple stairs to the Coyolxāuhqui stone. There, they were decapitated and dismembered, just as Coyolxāuhqui was by Huītzilōpōchtli on Coatepec.

== See also ==
- Aztec sun stone
- Stone of Motecuhzoma I
- Stone of Tizoc
- Coatepec
- Pānquetzaliztli
- Coyolxauhqui imperative, a theory named after the goddess
