= Templo Mayor =

Former Aztec temple in Tenochtitlan (now Mexico City)

- Huēyi Teōcalli
- Modern model of the Templo Mayor as it appeared in the early 16th century at the National Museum of Anthropology in Mexico City
- Interactive map of Templo Mayor
- 19°25′59.88″N 99°7′58.008″W
- Periods: Late Postclassic
- Cultures: Aztec
- Location: Mexico City, Mexico

UNESCO World Heritage Site
- Official name: Historic Centre of Mexico City and Xochimilco
- Criteria: Cultural: ii, iii, iv, v
- Reference: 412
- Inscription: 1987 (11th Session)
- Area: 3,010.86 ha (7,440.0 acres)

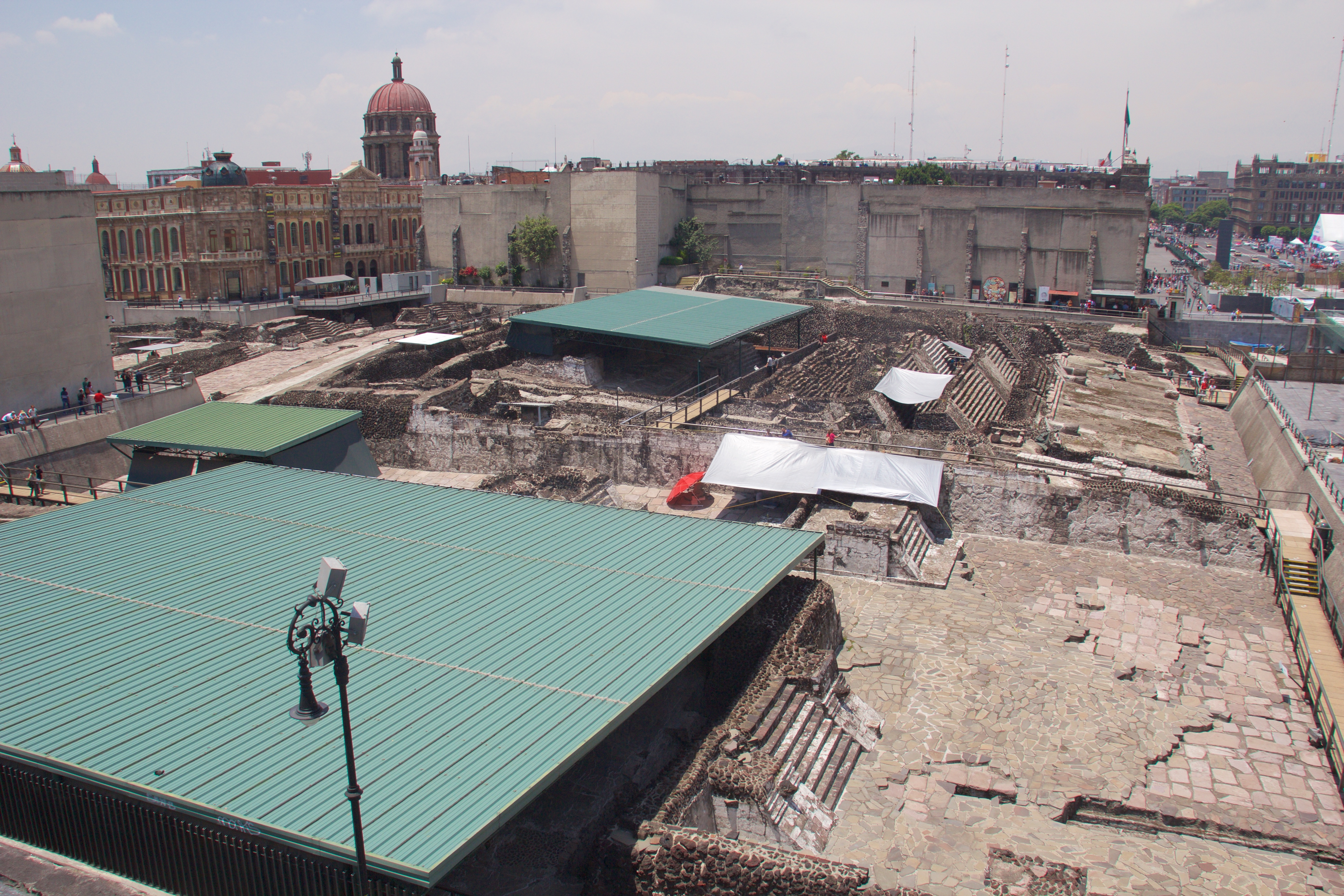
View of the Templo Mayor and the surrounding buildings.

The Templo Mayor (from Spanish: 'Main Temple') was the main temple of the Mexica people in their capital city of Tenōchtitlan, which is now Mexico City. Erected in its final form in the late Postclassic period, the temple was called Huēyi Teōcalli [we:ˈi teoːˈkalːi] in the Nahuatl language, meaning 'great church' or 'great house of god', and understood to be the center of the universe. It was dedicated simultaneously to Huītzilōpōchtli, god of war, and Tlāloc, god of rain and agriculture, each of which had a shrine at the top of the pyramid with separate staircases. The central spire was devoted to Quetzalcōātl in his form as the wind god, Ehēcatl. The temple devoted to Huītzilōpōchtli and Tlāloc, measuring approximately 100 by 80 m (328 by 262 ft) at its base, dominated the Sacred Precinct. Construction of the first temple began sometime after 1325, and it was rebuilt six times. The temple was almost totally destroyed by the Spanish in 1521, and Mexico City Metropolitan Cathedral was built nearby.

The Zócalo, or main plaza of Mexico City today, was developed to the southwest of Templo Mayor, which is located in the block between Seminario and Justo Sierra streets. The site is part of the Historic Center of Mexico City, which was added to the UNESCO World Heritage List in 1987. It received 801,942 visitors in 2017.

== Historical overview ==
The first of seven temples built on the Templo Mayor site was built in 1325, and the second temple existed by 1375. In 1454, the largest known expansion of the temple took place under the guidance of Moctezuma I.

The seventh temple was first mentioned by the conquistadors in 1519, and the temple was last altered by the Aztecs in 1520. The conquistadors then sacked and destroyed the building one year later in 1521.

== Discovery and excavation ==
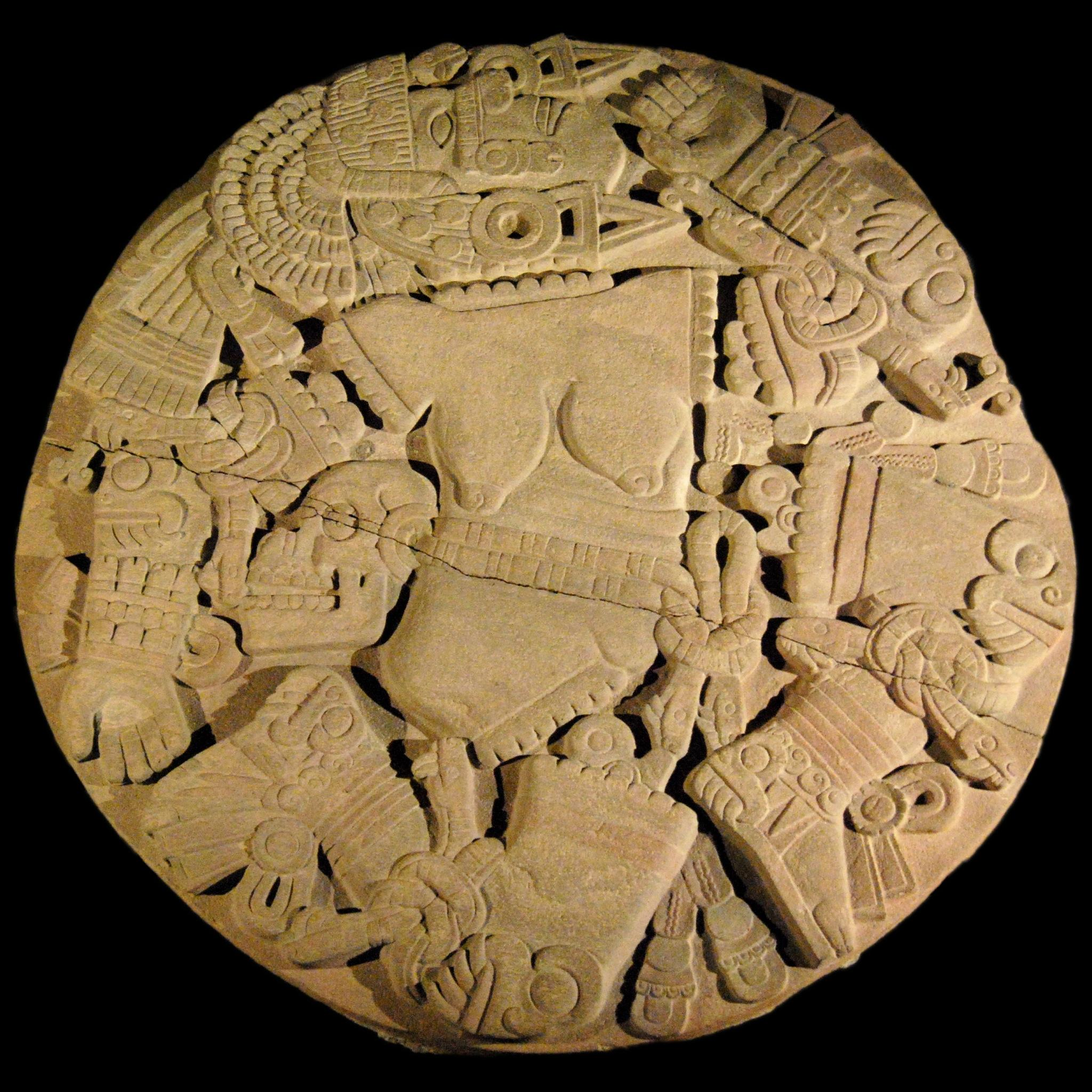
Disk depicting a dismembered Coyolxauhqui which was found during construction in 1978

After the destruction of Tenōchtitlan, the Templo Mayor, like most of the rest of the city, was disassembled to be used as construction materials to create the Spanish colonial city. The Temple's exact location was forgotten. By the 20th century, scholars had a good idea where to look for it based on archeological work completed at the end of the 19th and first half of the 20th centuries. Leopoldo Batres did some excavation work at the end of the 19th century under the Mexico City Metropolitan Cathedral because, at the time, researchers thought the cathedral had been built over the ruins of the temple, though it was later proven to be just southwest of the temple.

In the first decades of the 20th century, Manuel Gamio found part of the southwest corner of the temple, and his findings were put on public display. However, the discovery did not generate great public interest in excavating further as the zone was an upper-class residential area. In 1933, Emilio Cuevas found part of a staircase and beam. In 1948, Hugo Moedano and Elma Estrada Balmori excavated a platform containing serpent heads and offerings. In 1966, Eduardo Contreras and Jorge Angula excavated a chest containing offerings, which had first been explored by Gamio.

The push to fully excavate the site did not come until late in the 20th century. On 21 February 1978, workers for Comisión Federal de Electricidad (CFE), the city's electricity provider, were digging at a place in the city then popularly known as the "island of the dogs" as the area was slightly elevated and stray dogs would gather there during times of flooding. Just over two meters down, the diggers struck a massive pre-Hispanic stone disk of over 3.25 meters (10.7 feet) in diameter, 30 centimeters (11.8 inches) thick, and weighing 8.5 metric tons (8.4 long tons; 9.4 short tons). The relief on the stone was later determined to be Coyolxauhqui, Huitzilopochtli's sister, and was dated to the end of the 15th century.

From 1978 to 1982, specialists directed by archeologist Eduardo Matos Moctezuma worked on the project to excavate the Temple. Initial excavations found that many of the artifacts were in good enough condition to study. Efforts coalesced into the Templo Mayor Project, which was authorized by presidential decree.

To complete the excavation, 13 buildings in this area were demolished including 9 built in the 1930s and 4 dating from the 19th century that had preserved colonial elements. During excavations, more than 7,000 objects were found, mostly offerings including effigies; clay pots in the image of Tlaloc; skeletons of turtles, frogs, crocodiles, and fish; snail shells; coral; gold; alabaster; Mixtec figurines; ceramic urns from Veracruz; masks from what is now Guerrero state; copper rattles; and decorated skulls and knives of obsidian and flint. These artifacts are now housed in the Templo Mayor Museum. This museum is the result of the work done since the early 1980s to rescue, preserve, and investigate Templo Mayor, its Sacred Precinct, and all objects associated with it while making these findings available to the public.

== Earlier versions ==
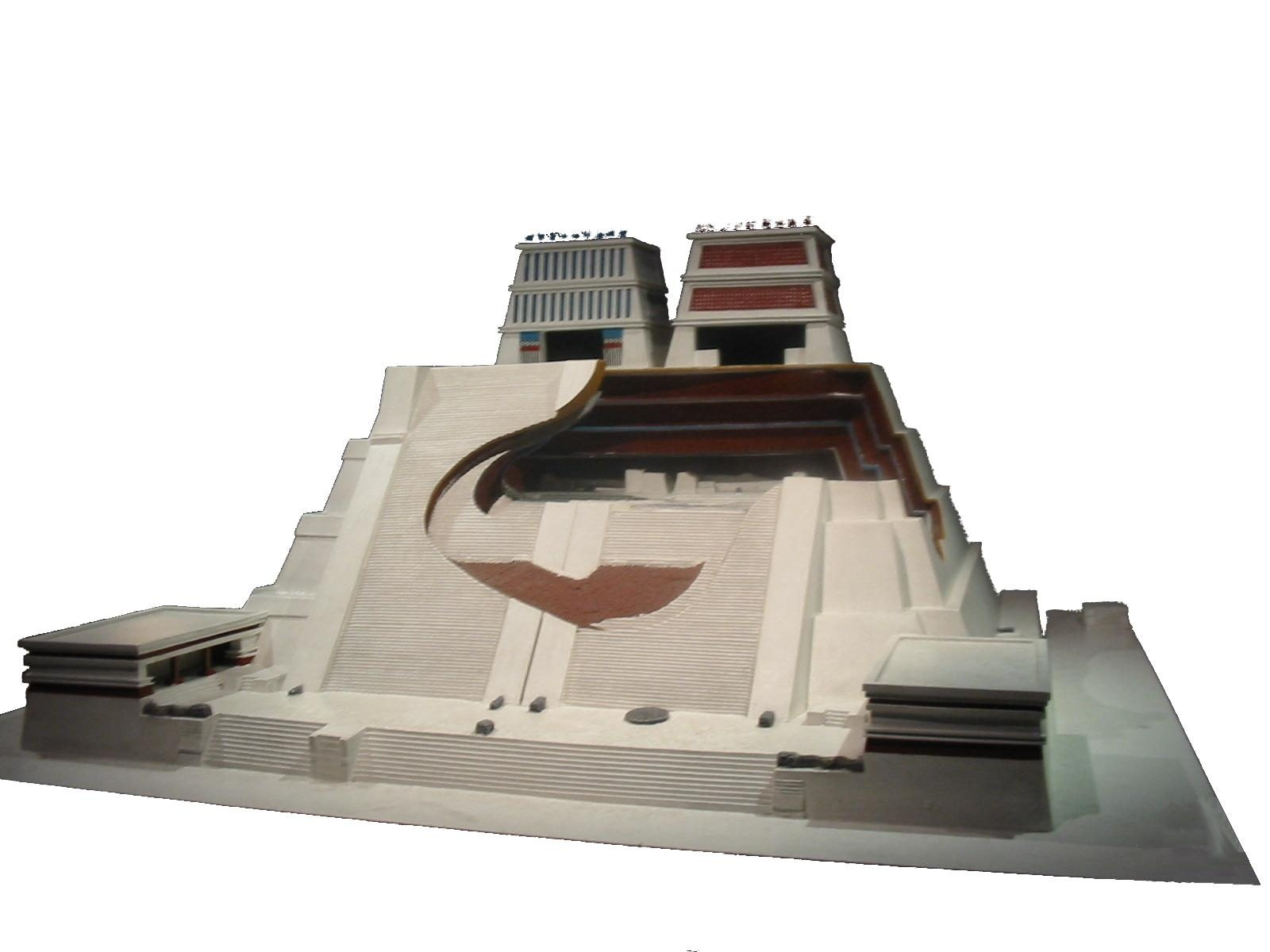
Scale model of the Templo Mayor of Tenōchtitlan showing the various stages as it was enlarged over time.

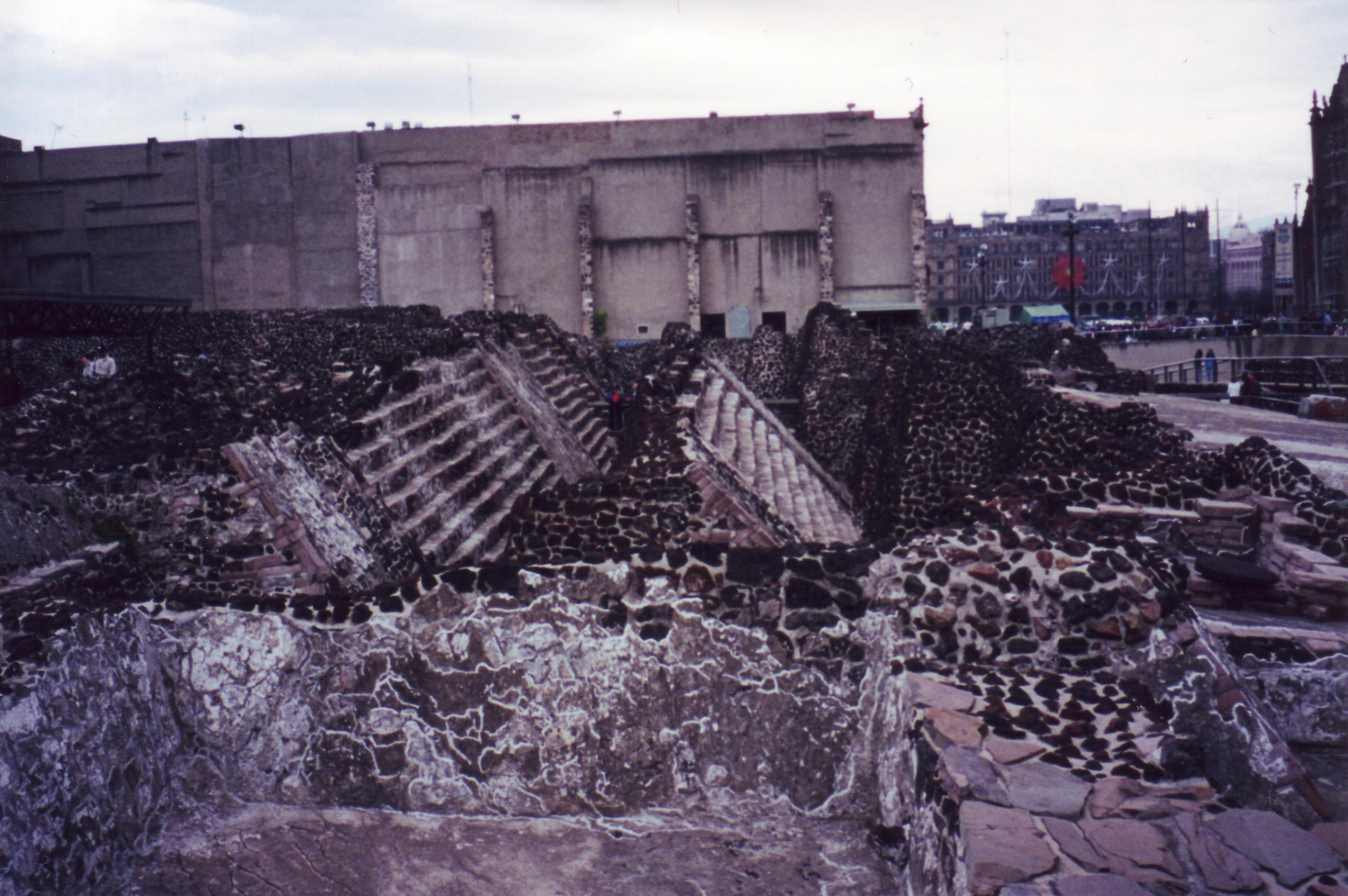
The nested remains of successive phases of construction (1999)

The excavated site consists of two parts: 1) the temple itself, exposed and labeled to show its various stages of development, along with some other associated buildings, and 2) the museum, built to house the smaller and more fragile objects.

The process of expanding an Aztec temple was typically completed by new structures being built over earlier ones, using the bulk of the former as a base for the latter. The Aztecs began construction of Templo Mayor sometime after 1325, and the temple was rebuilt six times. All seven stages of the Templo Mayor, except the first, have been excavated and assigned to the reigns of the emperors who were responsible for them.

=== First Temple ===
The first temple is only known through historical records because the high water table of the old lakebed prevents excavation. According to these records, the first pyramid was built with earth and perishable wood, which may not have survived to the present time.

=== Second Temple ===
The second temple was built during the reigns of Acamapichtli, Huitzilihuitl and Chimalpopoca between 1375 and 1427. The upper part of this temple has been excavated, exposing two stone shrines covered in stucco on the north side. A chacmool was uncovered as well. On the south side, there is a sacrificial stone called a téchcatl and a sculpted face.

=== Third Temple ===
The third temple was built between 1427 and 1440 during the reign of Itzcoatl. A staircase with eight stone standard-bearers is from this stage bearing the glyph with the year Four-Reed (1431). These standard bearers act as "divine warriors" guarding the access to the upper shrines.

=== Fourth Temple ===
The fourth temple was constructed between 1440 and 1481 during the reigns of Moctezuma I and Axayacatl. This stage is considered to have the richest of the architectural decorations as well as sculptures. Most findings from the excavations date from this period. The great platform was decorated with serpents and braziers, some of which are in the form of monkeys and some in the form of Tlaloc. During this time, the stairway to the shrine of Tlaloc was defined by a pair of undulating serpents and the middle of this shrine was a small altar featuring a pair of sculpted frogs. The circular monolith of Coyolxauhqui also dates from this time.

=== Fifth Temple ===
The fifth temple (1481–1486) is dated to the short reign of Tizoc. During these five years, the platform was recovered in stucco and the ceremonial plaza was paved.

=== Sixth Temple ===
The sixth temple was built during the reign of Ahuizotl. He finished some of the updates made by Tizoc and added his own, as shown on the carvings of the "commemoration stone of the huei teocalli", depicting the two tlatoqueh celebrating the opening of the temple during the last day of the month Panquetzaliztli dedicated to Huitzilopochtli, day 7 acatl of the year 8 acatl (19 December 1487). The Sacred Precinct was walled off, and this wall was decorated with serpent heads. He built three shrines and the House of the Eagle Warriors.

== Seventh Temple ==
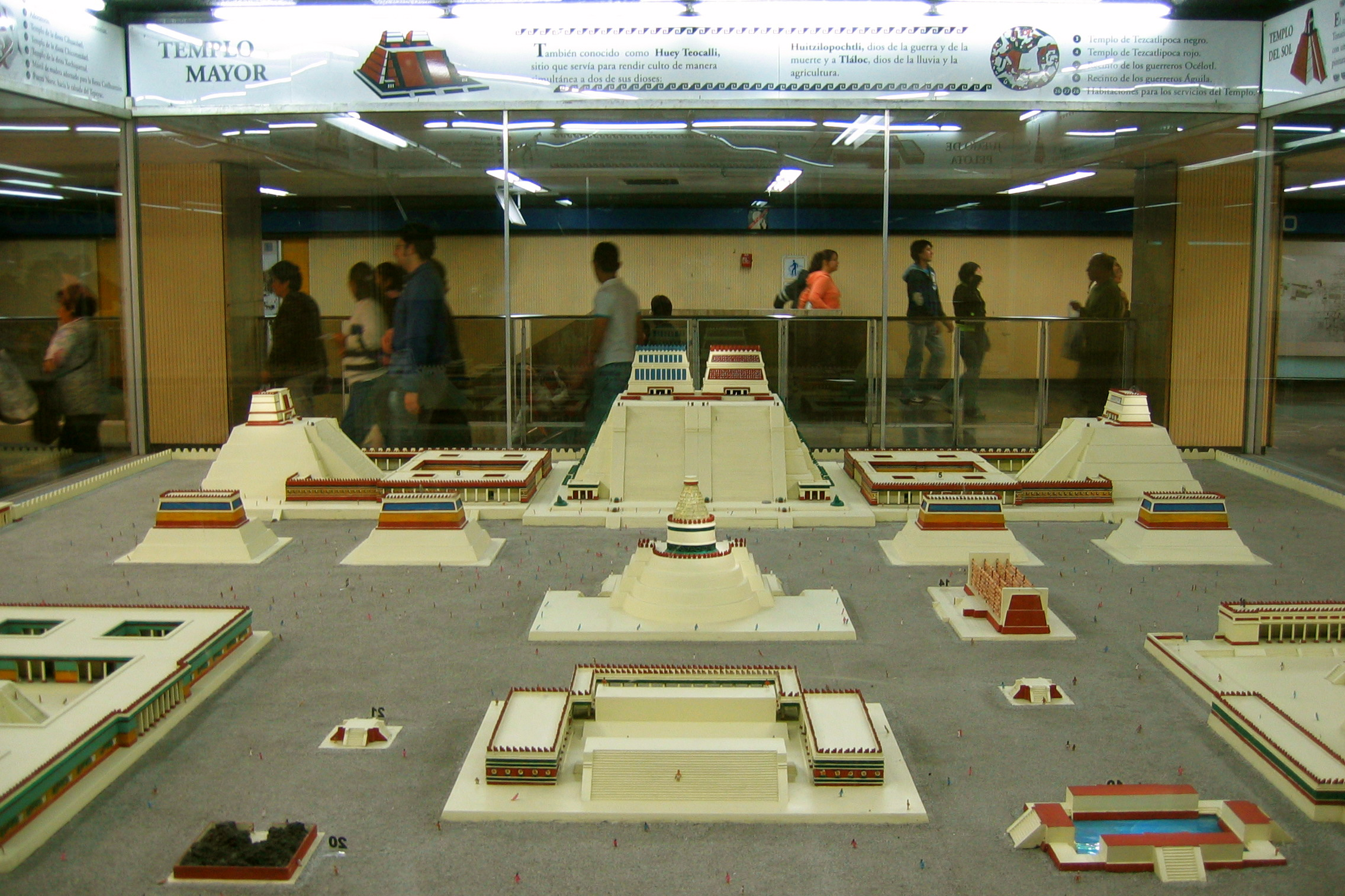
Model of the Sacred Precinct, in the Mexico City Metro's Zócalo station.

Very little remains of the Seventh Temple because of the demolitions undertaken to build the cathedral. Only a platform to the north and a section of paving in the courtyard on the south side can still be seen. Most of what is known about this temple is based on the historical record. It was at the time the largest and most important active ceremonial center. Fray Bernardino de Sahagún reported that the Sacred Precinct had 78 buildings with Templo Mayor towering above them all.

The pyramid was composed of four sloped terraces with a passage between each level, topped by a great platform. It had two stairways to access the two shrines on the top platform. Facing the structure, the left shrine was dedicated to the water god Tlaloc while the right shrine was dedicated to the god of the sun and war, Huitzilopochtli. The two temples were approximately 60 meters (200 feet) in height, including the pyramid, and each had large braziers where the sacred fires continuously burned. The entrance to each temple had statues of robust and seated men which supported the standard-bearers and banners of handmade bark paper. Each stairway was defined by balustrades flanking the stairs, terminating in menacing serpent heads at the base. These stairways were used only by the priests and sacrificial people. The entire building was originally covered with stucco and polychrome paint.

The deities were housed inside the temple, shielded from the outside by curtains. The figure of Huitzilopochtli was modeled from amaranth seeds held together with honey and human blood. Inside of him were bags containing jade, bones, and amulets to give life to the god. This figure was constructed annually, and it was richly dressed and fitted with a mask of gold for his festival held during the Aztec month of Panquetzaliztli. At the end of the festival, the image was broken apart and shared among the populace to be eaten.

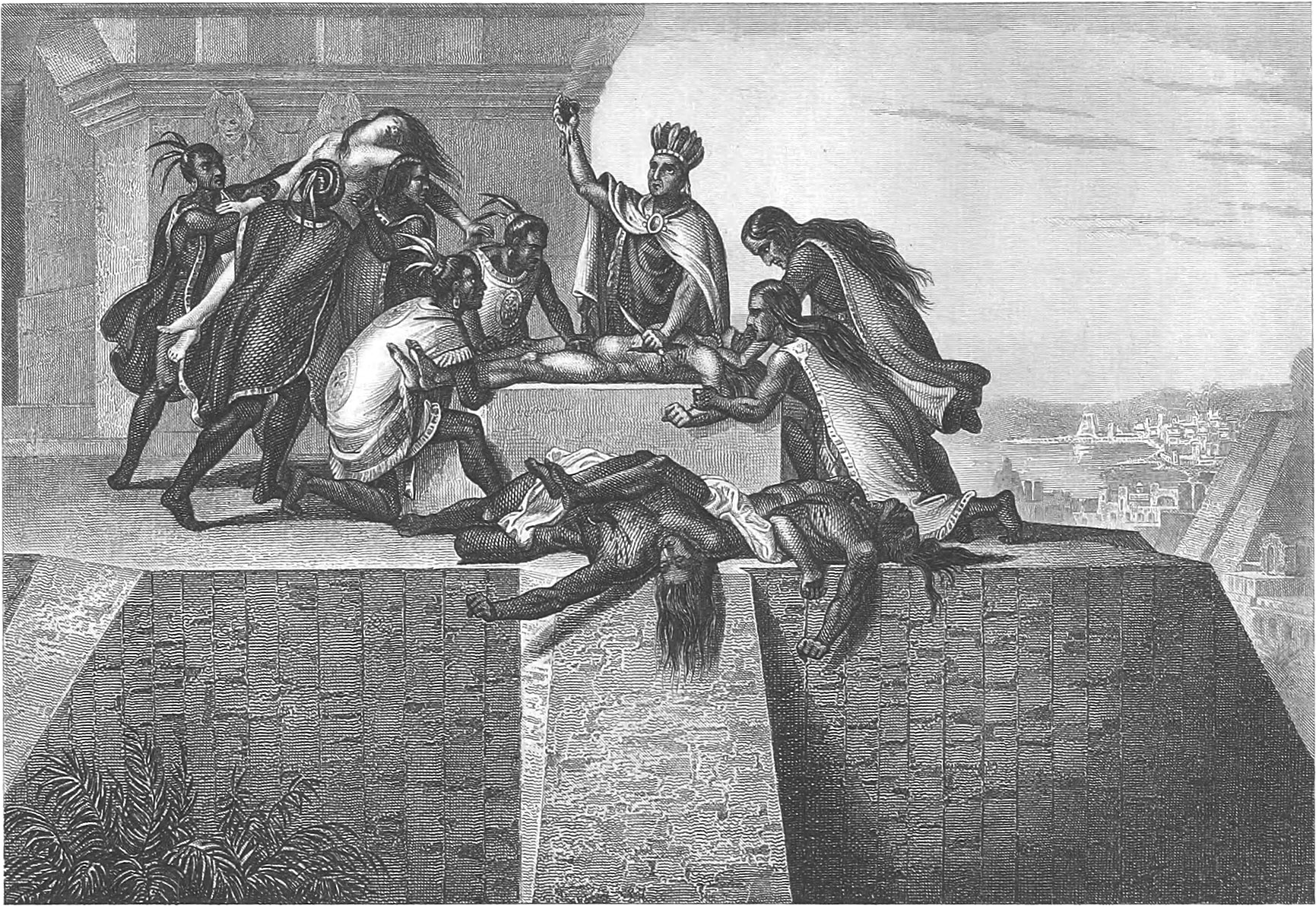
Human sacrifice by Johann Georg Heck.

In his description of the city, Cortés records that he and the other Spaniards were impressed by the number and magnificence of the temples constructed in Tenōchtitlan, but that this was tempered by disdain for their beliefs and human sacrifice. On 14 November 1519, Cortes seized the emperor Moctezuma II and ordered the destruction of all Aztec religious relics. Cortes ordered a Catholic cross placed on the Templo Mayor. While Cortes left for Veracruz to confront Spaniards looking to arrest him, Pedro de Alvarado, claiming to have uncovered a plot, staged a massacre of the Aztec nobility in the Sacred Precinct while they celebrated a religious festival. Unarmed and trapped within the walls of the Sacred Precinct, an estimated 8,000–10,000 Aztec nobles were killed. When word of the massacre spread throughout the city, the people turned on the Spaniards, killing seven, wounding many, and driving the rest back to their quarters. The Spaniards were trapped between two Aztec forces, and 68 were captured alive. Ten of these Spanish captives were immediately sacrificed at the Temple, and their severed heads were thrown back to the Spaniards. The others were sacrificed at the Great Temple that night, which could be seen from the Spanish camps. The sacrificed Spaniards were flayed, and their faces – with beards attached – were tanned and sent to allied towns, both to solicit assistance and to warn against betraying the Triple Alliance. The Spaniards were later temporarily evicted from the city but recruited allies to besiege and capture it in 1521.

After the fall of Tenōchtitlan in 1521, the lands controlled by the Aztecs became part of the Spanish empire. All the temples, including the Templo Mayor, were sacked, taking all objects of gold and other precious materials. Cortés, who had ordered the destruction of the existing capital, had a Mediterranean-style city built on the site. Essential elements of the old imperial center, including the Templo Mayor, were buried under similarly key features of the new city in what is now the historical downtown of the Mexico City. The Templo Mayor and Sacred Precinct were demolished and a Spanish church, later the main cathedral, was built on the western half of the precinct.

== Orientation ==
Fray Toribio de Motolinía, a Spanish friar who arrived to Mexico soon after the invasion, writes in his work Memoriales that the Aztec feast of Tlacaxipehualiztli "took place when the sun stood in the middle of [the Temple of] Huitzilopochtli, which was at the equinox". This statement has become very famous, as it is the only textual reference known so far that explicitly relates a Mesoamerican temple with astronomical observations. The measurements in the Templo Mayor confirmed the veracity of this comment. The orientation of stage II, the earliest of the archaeologically attested construction phases, is different from that adopted by stage III and preserved in all subsequent stages. One of the sunset dates corresponding to the east–west axis of the late stages, including the last, is 4 April, which in the Julian calendar of the 16th century was equivalent to 25 March. In 1519, this was the last day of Tlacaxipehualiztli, that is, precisely the day of the feast of the month. Furthermore, 25 March, the Feast of the Annunciation, was in the Middle Ages commonly identified with the vernal equinox. Consequently, Motolinía did not refer to the astronomical equinox (the date of which would have hardly been known to a non-astronomer at that time), but rather only pointed out the correlation between the day of the Mexica festival, which in the last years before the invasion coincided with the solar phenomenon in the Templo Mayor, and the date in the Christian calendar that corresponded to the traditional day of spring equinox.

== Symbolism ==
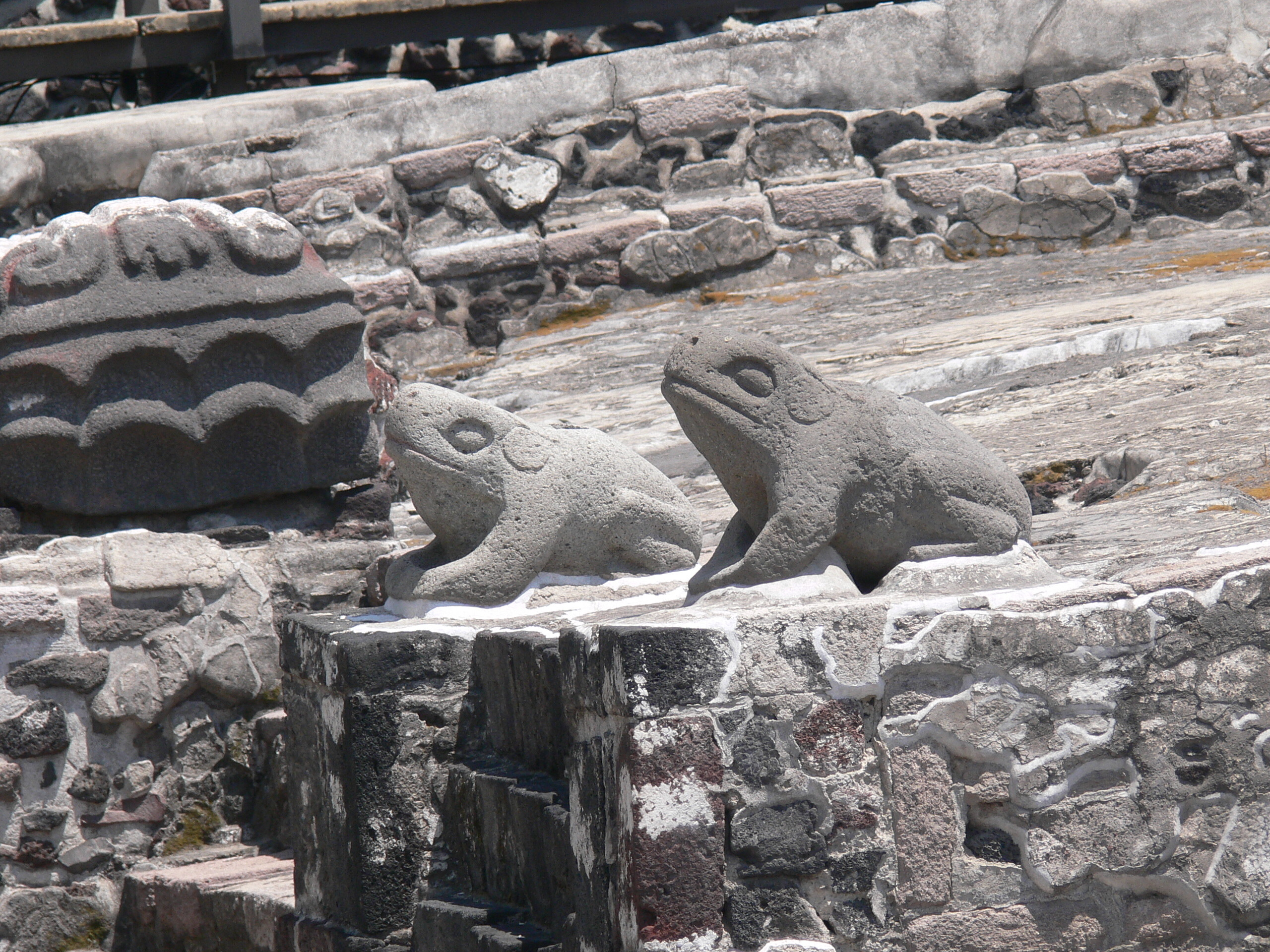
Altar of the toads as symbols of water

According to tradition, the Templo Mayor is located on the exact spot where the god Huitzilopochtli gave the Mexica people his sign that they had reached the promised land: an eagle on a nopal cactus with a snake in its mouth.

The Templo Mayor was partially a symbolic representation of the Hill of Coatepec, where according to Mexica myth, Huitzilopochtli was born. Huitzilopochtli emerged from his mother Coatlicue fully grown and fully armed to battle his sister Coyolxauhqui and her brothers the Centzon Huitznahua who intended to kill him and their mother. Huitzilopochtli was victorious, slaying and dismembering his sister. Her body was then thrown to the bottom of the hill. As the southern half of the Great Temple represented Coatepec (on the side dedicated to Huitzilopochtli), the great stone disk with Coyolxauhqui's dismembered body was found at the foot of this side of the temple. The northern half represented Tonacatepetl, the mountain home of Tlaloc.

The sacred ballcourt and skull rack were located at the foot of the stairs of the twin temples, to mimic, like the stone disk, where Huitzilopochtli was said to have placed the goddess' severed head. These locations served as a place for the reenactment of the mythical conflict.

The various levels of the Temple also represent the cosmology of the Aztec world. First of all, it is aligned with the cardinal directions with gates that connect to roads leading in these directions. This indicates the place where the plane of the world that humans live in intersects the thirteen levels of the heavens, called Topan and the nine levels of the underworld, called Mictlan.

Archaeologist Eduardo Matos Moctezuma, in his essay "Symbolism of the Templo Mayor", posits that the orientation of the temple is indicative of the total vision that the Mexica had of the universe (cosmovision). He states that the "principal center, or navel, where the horizontal and vertical planes intersect, that is, the point from which the heavenly or upper plane and the plane of the Underworld begin and the four directions of the universe originate, is the Templo Mayor of Tenochtitlan." Matos Moctezuma supports his supposition by claiming that the temple acts as an embodiment of a living myth where "all sacred power is concentrated and where all the levels intersect." Said myth is the birth and struggle between Huitzilopochtli and Coyolxauhqui.

== Sacred Precinct and surrounding buildings ==
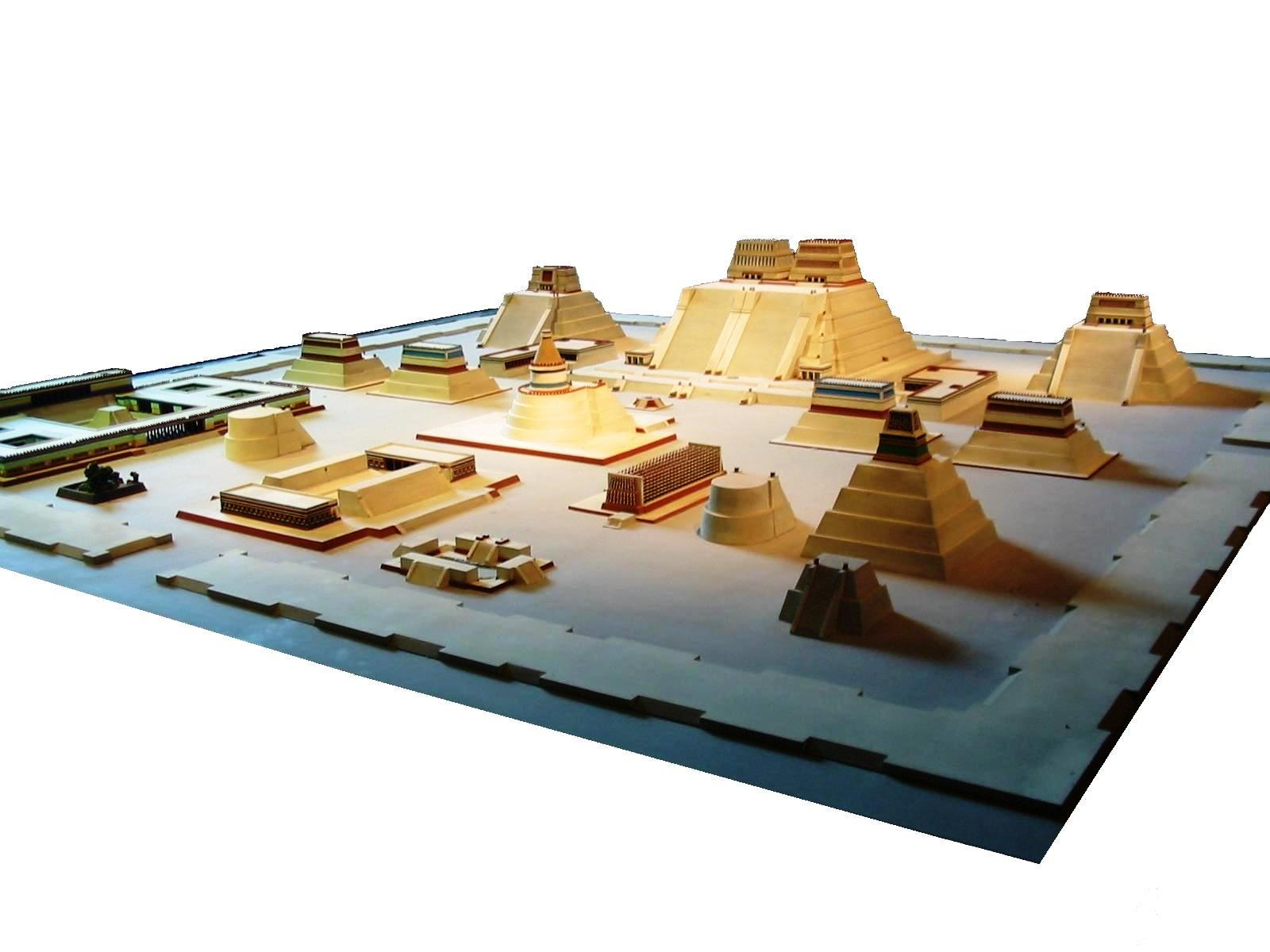
Situation of the Templo Mayor (upper centre) in the central district of Tenōchtitlan

The Sacred Precinct of the Templo Mayor was surrounded by a wall called the "coatepantli" (serpent wall). Among the most important buildings were the ballcourt, the Calmecac (area for priests), and the temples dedicated to Quetzalcoatl, Tezcatlipoca and the sun. The Templo Mayor itself delineated the eastern side of the Sacred Precinct.

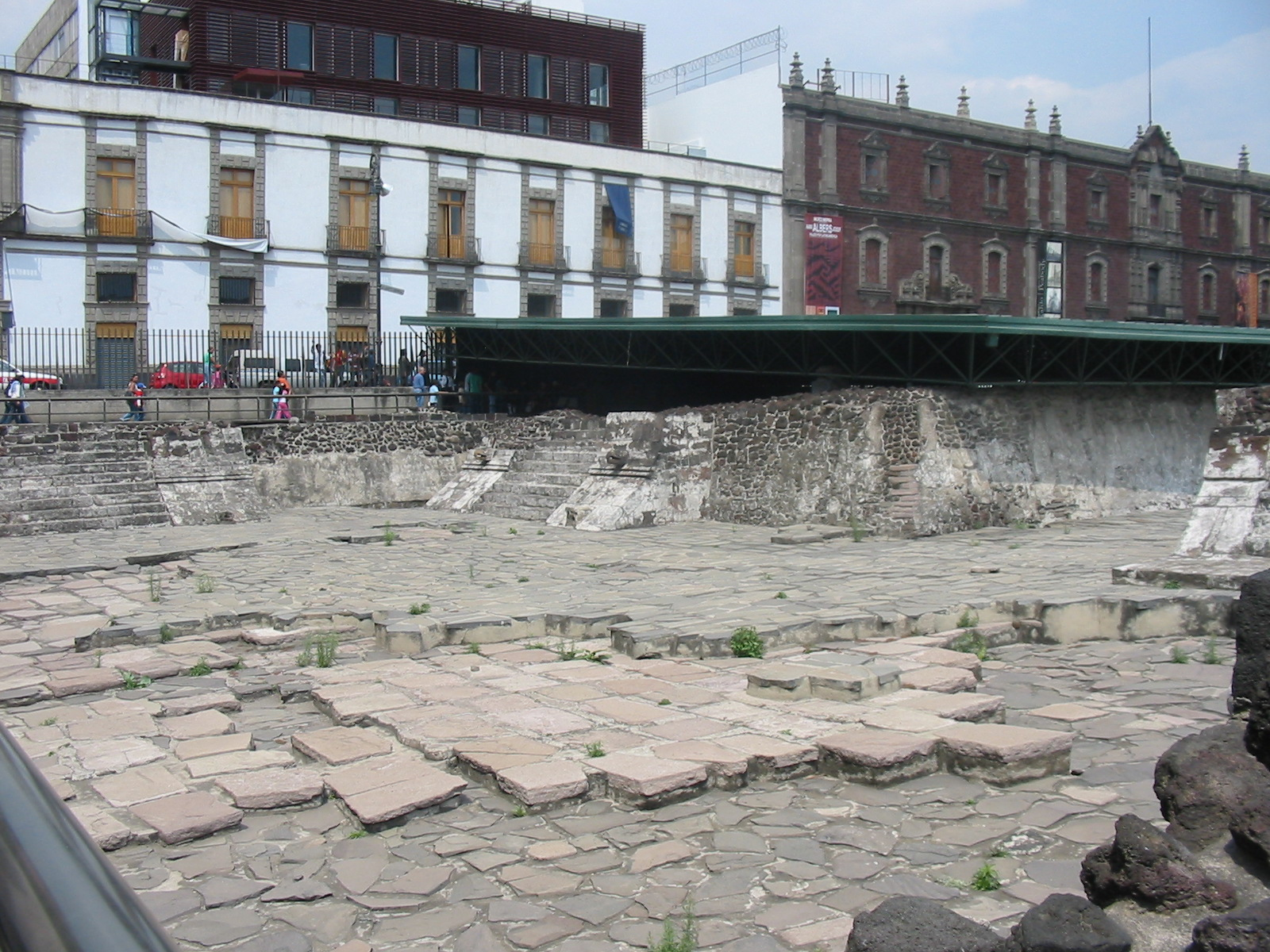
View of ruins of the "Eagle" building of the Templo Mayor complex. The roof is there to protect the remains of paintings that are inside.

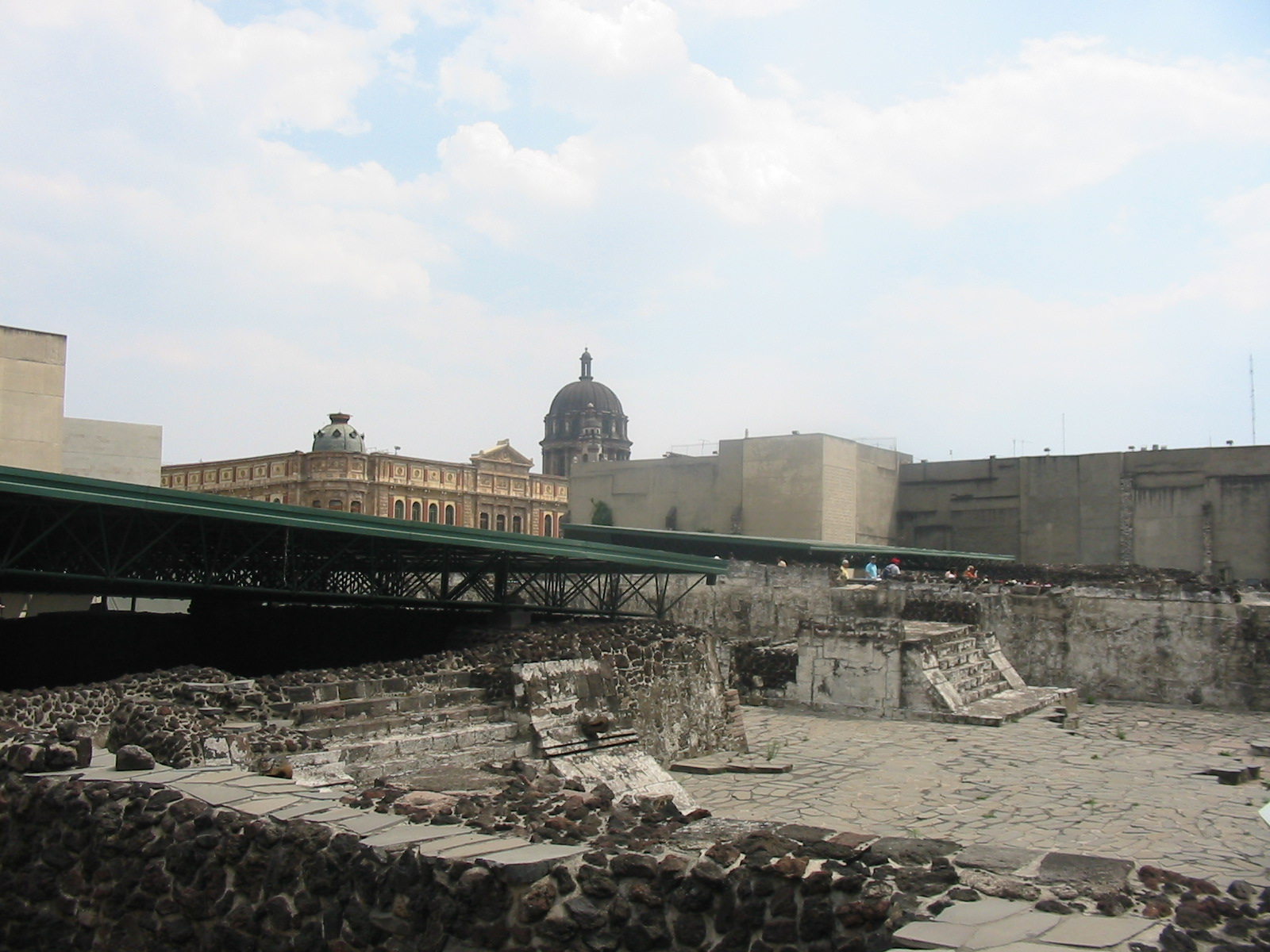
View of Eagle building and building A in the Templo Mayor complex. The ruins of the Great Temple are in the background.

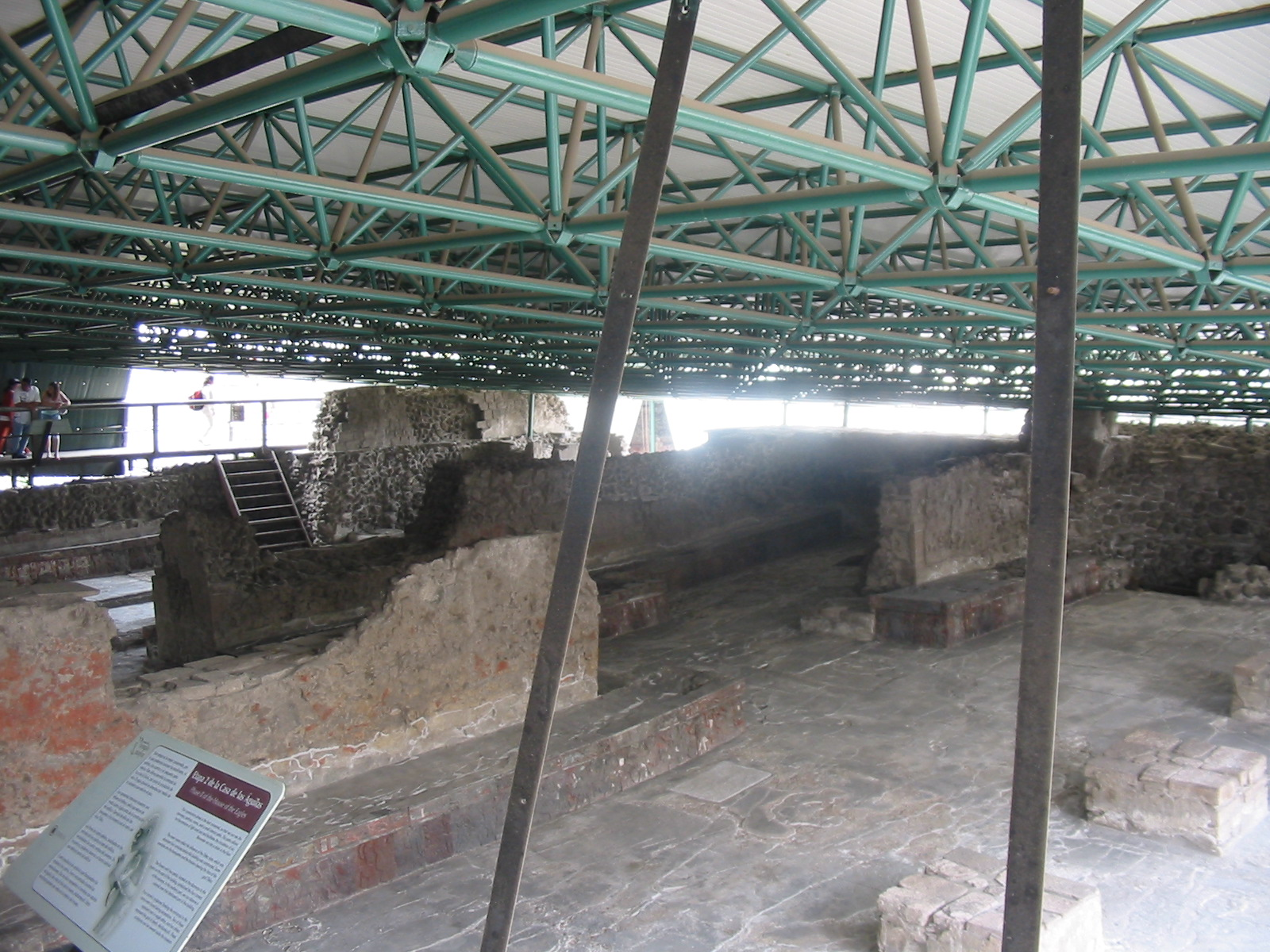
Inside the protected area of the Eagle Building of the Templo Mayor complex in Mexico City. Remnants of the original paint can still be seen.

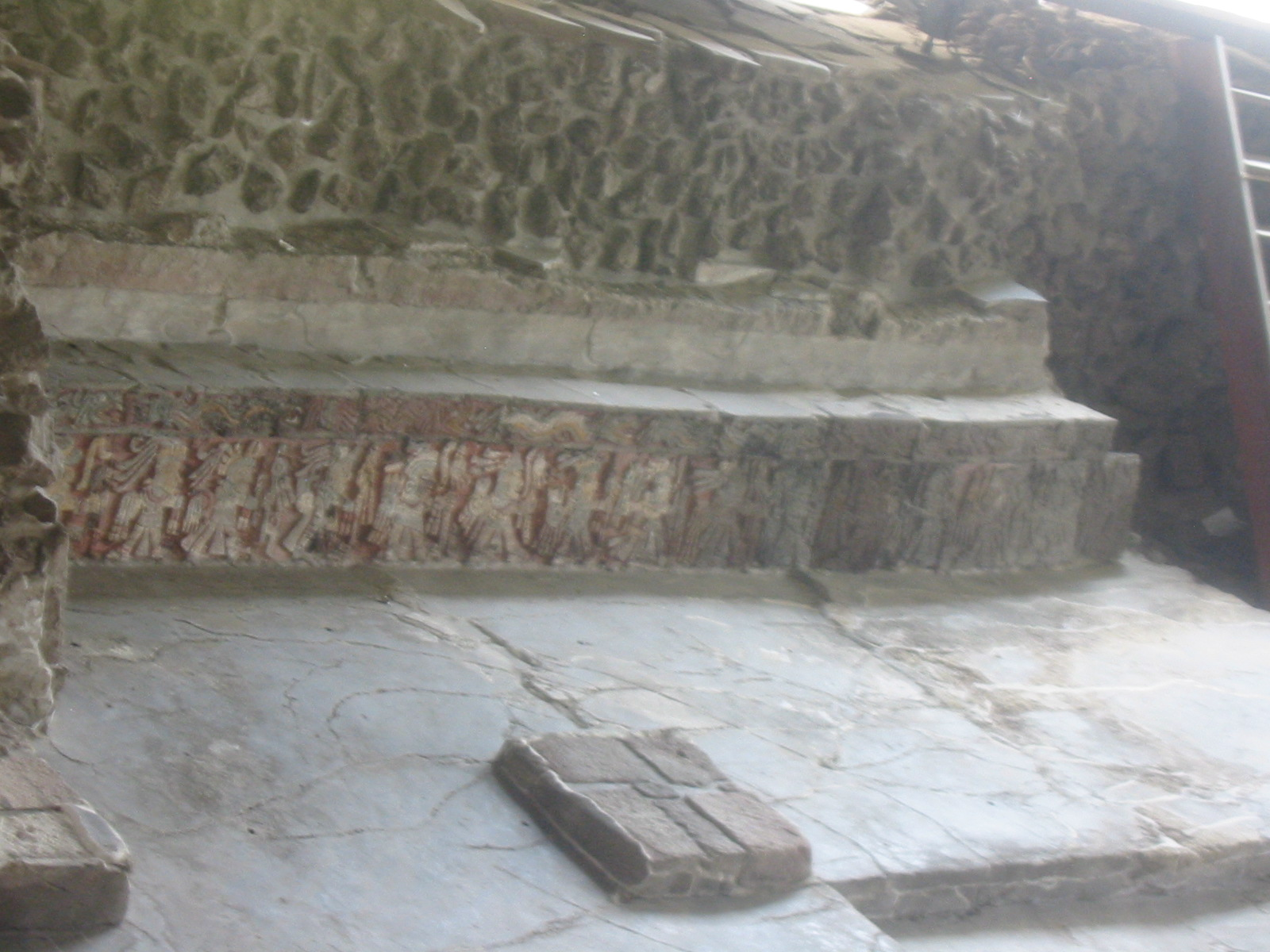
Close up of bas reliefs of eagle warriors in the Eagle building of the Templo Mayor complex. Some of the original paint can still be seen.

On the sides of the Templo Mayor, archeologists have excavated a number of palatial rooms and conjoining structures. One of the best preserved and most important is the Palace (or House) of the Eagle Warriors. This area dates back to the fourth stage of the temple, around 1469. It was excavated in 1981 and 1982 by José Francisco Hinojosa. It is a large L-shaped room with staircases decorated with sculptures of eagle heads. To enter this main room, one had to pass through an entrance guarded by two large sculpted representations of these warriors. The Eagle Warriors were a privileged class who were dedicated to the god Huitzilopochtli, and dressed to look like eagles. Adjoining this palace is the temple for these warriors—also known as the Red Temple. This temple shows clear Teotihuacan influence in its paintings (mostly in red) and the design of its altar. Almost all the interior walls of the House of the Eagles are decorated with beautiful paintings and contain long benches, which are also painted. These benches are composed of two panels. The upper one is a frieze with undulating serpents in bas-relief. The lower panel shows processions of armed warriors converging on a zacatapayolli, a grass ball into which the Mexica stuck bloody lancets during the ritual of autosacrifice. This palace specifically imitates much of the style of the Burnt Palace, located in the ruins of Tula. A number of important artifacts have been found in this area, the most important of which are two nearly identical large ceramic sculptures of Mictlantecuhtl, the god of death. Despite being found in fragile pieces, they were both reconstructed and are on display at the on-site museum.

Another conjoining area was dedicated to the Ocelot Warriors. Their temple, dedicated to the god Tezcatlipoca, lies under the current Museo de la Secretaría de Hacienda y Crédito Público to the south of the Templo Mayor.

The Calmecac was a residence hall for priests and a school for future priests, administrators and politicians, where they studied theology, literature, history and astronomy. Its exact location is on one side of what is now Donceles Street. The Temple of Quetzalcoatl was located to the west of the Templo Mayor. It is said that during the equinox, the sun rose between the shrines dedicated to Huitzilopochtli and Tlaloc and shone directly on this temple. Due to the god's serpentine nature, the temple had a circular base instead of a rectangular one.

The ball field, called the tlachtli or teutlachtli, was similar to many sacred ball fields in Mesoamerica. Games were played barefoot, and players used their hips to move a heavy ball to stone rings. The field was located west of the Templo Mayor, near the twin staircases and oriented east–west. Next to this ball field was the "huey tzompanti" where the skulls of sacrifice victims were kept after being covered in stucco and decorated.

The Temple of the Sun was located west of the Templo Mayor also and its remains lie under the Metropolitan Cathedral. The project to shore up the cathedral at the end of the 20th century and beginning of the 21st brought to light a number of artifacts.

== Offerings ==
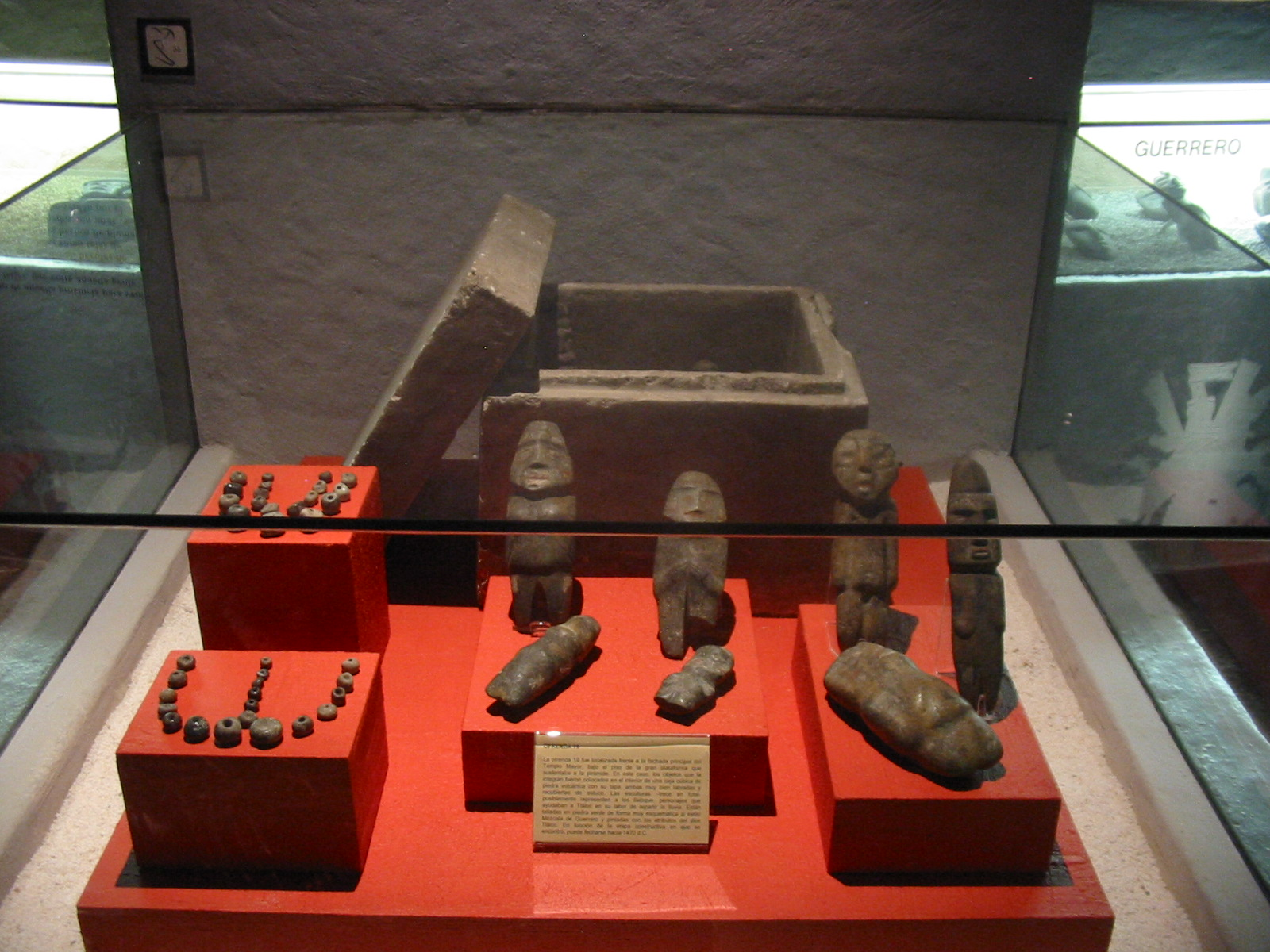
Stone offering box and contents found at the Templo Mayor.

Most of the objects found in the Templo Mayor were offerings. Although many are of Mexica design, there are also abundant items from other peoples, brought in as tribute or through trade. Sculptures, flint knives, vessels, beads and other sumptuary ornaments—as well as minerals, plants and animals of all types, and the remains of human sacrifice—were among the items deposited in offerings. All of these fulfilled a specific function within the offering, depending on the symbolism of each object. In excavations at the Templo Mayor, different types of offerings have been found and have been grouped by researchers in terms of Time (the period in which the offering was deposited); Space (the location of the offering within the structure); Container (type and dimensions of the receptacle containing the objects); internal distribution (placement of objects within the offering) and value of the items. The offerings were usually contained in cavities, in stone urns, and in boxes made of slabs. These are found under floors; in platforms, architectural bodies, stairways and in temples. These offerings were placed accompanied by complex rituals following set temporal, spatial and symbolic patterns, depending on the intention of the offering.

The oldest Mexica objects, located in the second temple, are two urns which contain the remains of incinerated bones; one of the urns was made of obsidian and the other of alabaster. A small silver mask and a gold bell were found inside one urn, and second gold bell and two green stone beads were placed in the other.

Images of the gods Huehueteotl-Xiuhtecuhtli, together with Tlaloc, presided over most of the offerings found in the Templo Mayor. Representing fire and water respectively, this pair of deities probably symbolized the concept of "burning water," a metaphor for warfare.

Another theme exhibited in this hall is autosacrifice, a ritual that was conducted in private as a personal act of communication with the gods. Widespread throughout the entire population, this practice was performed by perforating certain fleshy parts of the body—such as the earlobes, lips, tongue, chest, calves, et cetera—with obsidian blades, agave needles or bone perforators. Once the implement was covered with blood, it was inserted in straw balls called Zacatapayoli. The entirety was probably placed in ceremonial boxes—tepetlacalli—as an offering to the gods. Objects associated with human sacrifice are the "face blades" or knives decorated with eyes and teeth, as well as skull masks. Other ceremonial items include musical instruments, jewelry, and braziers for the burning of copal.

== Museum ==
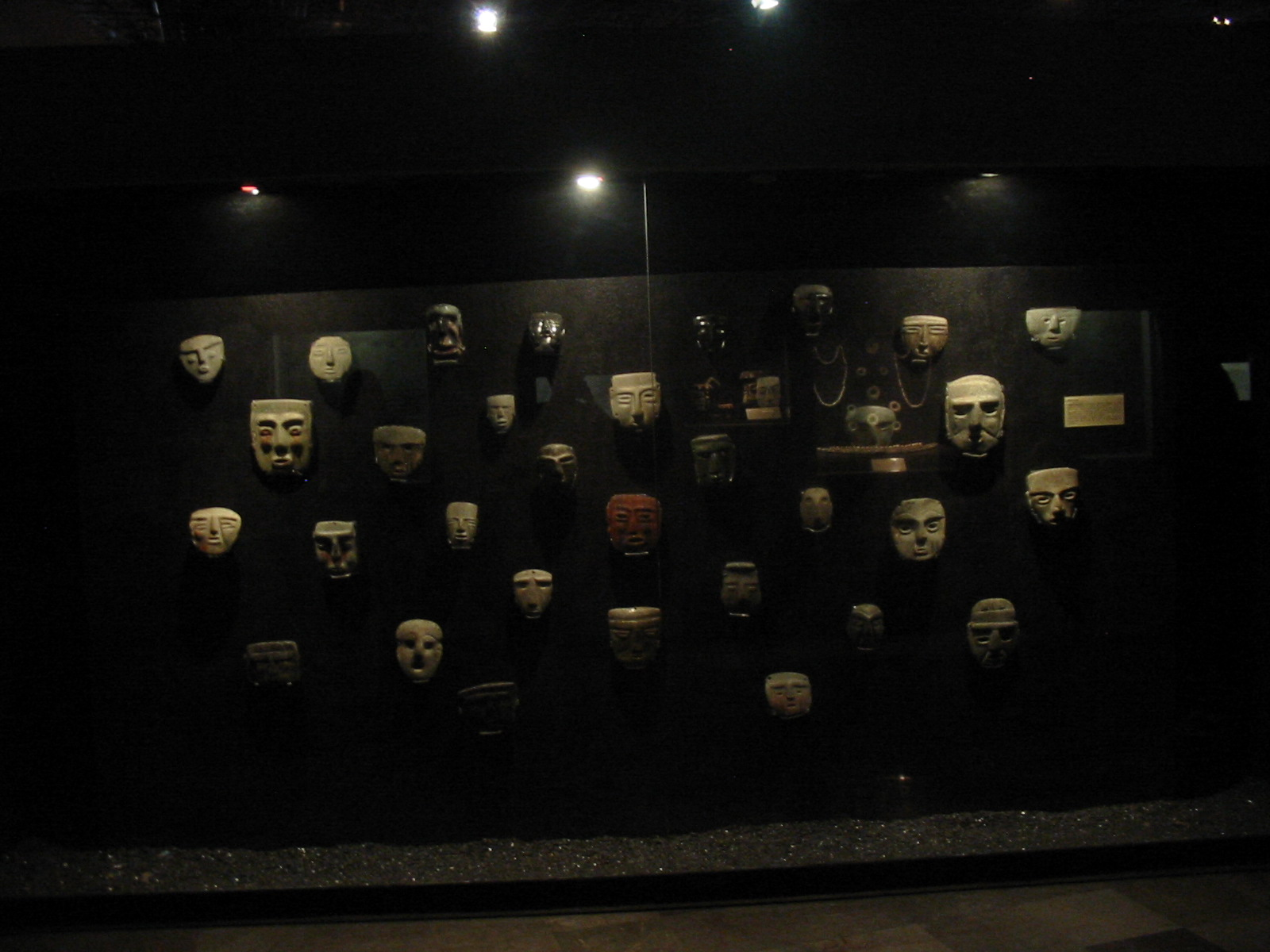
Wall display of stone masks found at the Templo Mayor site on display at the Templo Mayor museum.

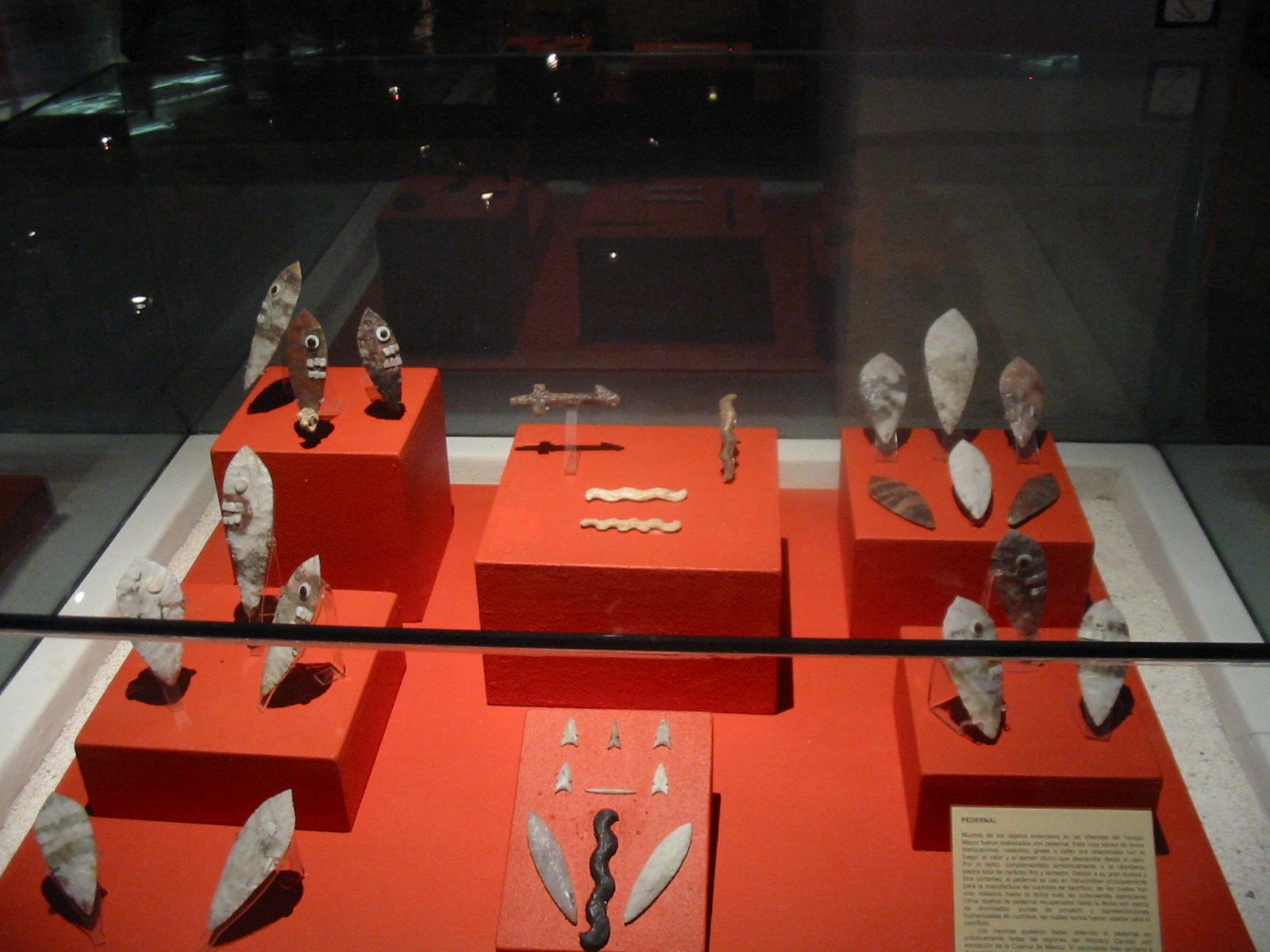
Flint blades on display at the museum of the Templo Mayor in Mexico City.

The museum of the Templo Mayor was built in 1987 to house the Templo Mayor Project and its finds—a project which continues work to this day. In 1991, the Urban Archeology Program was incorporated as part of the Templo Mayor Project whose mission is to excavate the oldest area of the city, around the main plaza. The museum building was built by architect Pedro Ramírez Vázquez, who envisioned a discreet structure that would blend in with the colonial surroundings. The museum has four floors, three of which are for permanent exhibitions and the fourth houses offices for the director, museum administration and research staff. Other departments are located in the basement, where there is also an auditorium.

The museum has eight main exhibition halls, each dedicated to a different theme. Room 1 is dedicated to the goddesses Coatlicue and Coyolxauhqui, mother and sister to Huitzlipochtli, respectively. Here are displayed the first finds associated with the temple, from the first tentative finds in the 19th century to the discovery of the huge stone disk of Coyolxauhqui, which initiated the Templo Mayor Project.

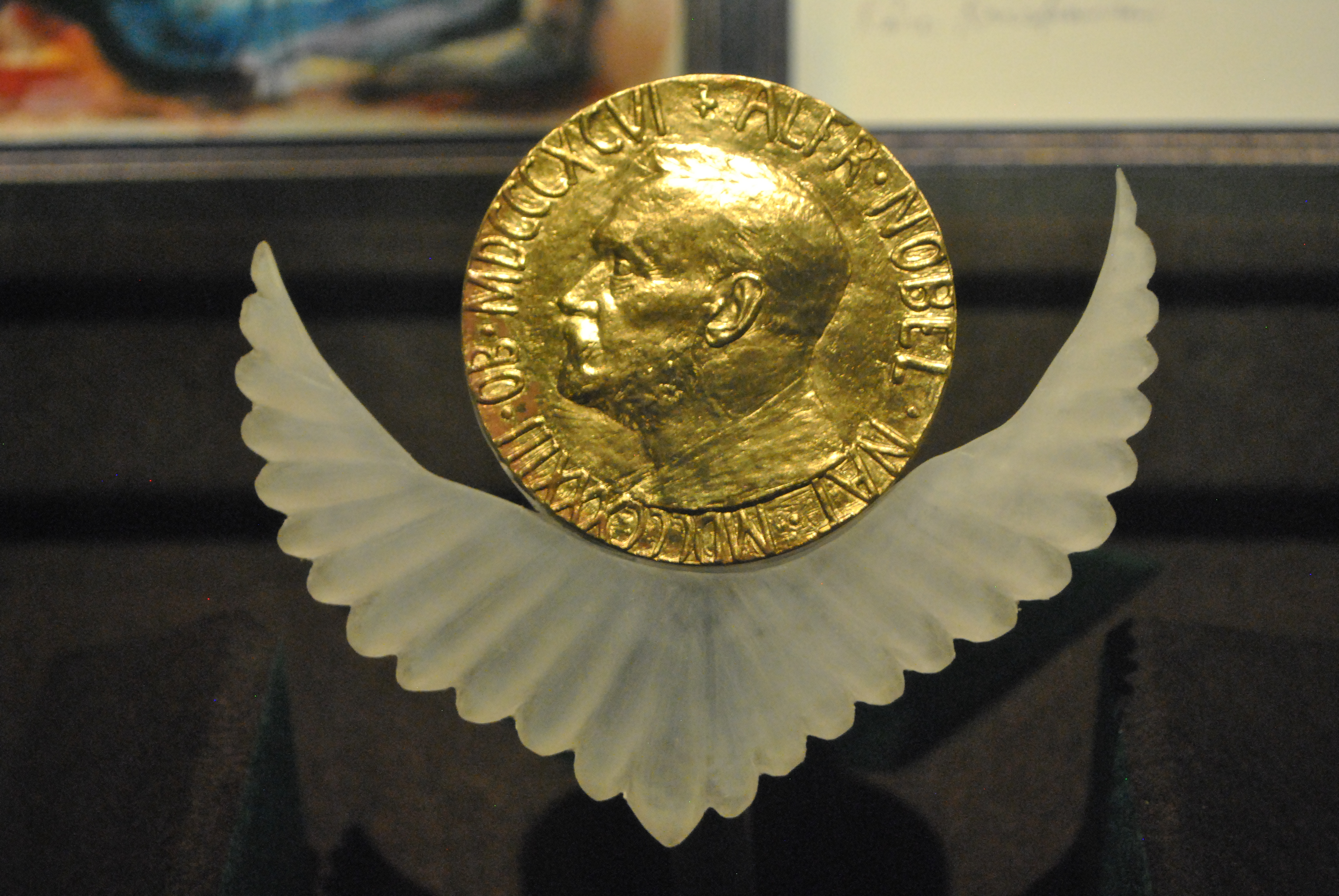
The Nobel Peace Prize Medal awarded to Rigoberta Menchú is safeguarded in the Museo del Templo Mayor in Mexico City.

Room 2 is dedicated to the concepts of ritual and sacrifice in Tenōchtitlan. This room contains urns where dignitaries where interred, funerary offerings, as well as objects associated with self and human sacrifice—such as musical instruments, knives and skulls.

Room 3 demonstrates the economics of the Aztec empire in the form of tribute and trade, with examples of finished products and raw materials from many parts of Mesoamerica. Room 4 is dedicated to the god Huitzilopochtli. His shrine at the temple was the most important and largest. This room contains various images of him as well as offerings. Also located here are the two large ceramic statues of the god Mictlantecuhtli which were found in the House of the Eagle Warriors who were dedicated to Huitzilopochtli.

Room 5 is dedicated to Tlaloc, the other principal deity of the Aztecs and one of the oldest in Mesoamerica. This room contains various images of the god usually worked in green or volcanic stone or in ceramic. The most prized work is a large pot with the god's face in high relief that still preserves much of the original blue paint. Room 6 is dedicated to the flora and fauna of Mesoamerica at this time, as most contained divine aspects for the Aztecs. Also many of the offerings found at the Templo Mayor were or were made from various plants and animals. Related to Room 6, Room 7 contains exhibits of the agricultural technology of the time, especially in the growing of corn and the construction of chinampas, the so-called "floating gardens". The last room is Room 8, which is dedicated to the archeology and history of the site.

== See also ==
- List of Mesoamerican pyramids
- Massacre in the Great Temple
- List of tallest structures built before the 20th century
