= Centzonmīmixcōa =

Aztec gods of the northern stars

In Aztec mythology, the Centzonmīmixcōah (Nahuatl pronunciation: [sentsonmiːmiʃˈkoːaʔ] or Centzon Mīmixcōah: the "Four Hundred Mimixcoa", Cloud Serpents) are the gods of the northern stars. They are sons of Camaxtle-Mixcoatl with the Earth Goddess (Tlaltecuhtli or Coatlicue), according to the Codex Ramírez, or Tonatiuh (the Fifth Sun) with Chalchiuhtlicue, the goddess of the seas.

According to the Manuscript of 1558, section 6, these 400 'Cloud-Serpents' were divinely slain [transformed into stars] in this wise; of their five protagonists:

- Cuāuhtli-icohuauh ('Eagle's Twin') "hid inside a tree";
- Mix-cōātl ('Cloud Serpent') "hid within the earth";
- Tlo-tepētl ('Hawk Mountain') "hid within a hill";
- Apan-teuctli ('River Lord') "hid in the water";
- their sister, Cuetlach-cihuatl, "hid in the ball-court."

From this ambuscade, these 5 slew the 400.

In Ce Tecpatl, after the Creation of the Fifth Sun in Teotihuacan, Camaxtle-Mixcoatl, one of the four gods, ascended to the Eighth Heaven and created four men and one woman to feed the Sun. However, being barely formed, they fell into the water, returned to the sky and there was no war. Frustrated by this attempt, Camaxtle struck a cane on a rock and, at the blow, 400 Chichimecs Mimixcoa sprouted that would populate the earth before the Aztecs. Camaxtle was able to do penance on the rock, drawing blood with maguey spikes, tongue and ears, and prayed to the gods that the four men and one woman created in the eighth heaven would come down to kill the barbarians in order to feed to the Sun.

The four men and one woman created in the Eighth Heaven are the five Mimixcoa who would later sacrifice the 400 Mimixcoa called Chichimecs or Otomies.

In Ce Tecpatl, the Mimixcoa were born, their mother Iztac-Chalchiuhtlicue went into a cave (Chicomoztoc or Tlalocan) and gave birth to five other Mimixcoa called Cuauhtlicoauh, Mixcoatl, Cuitlachcihuatl, Tlotepe and Apantecuhtli. After spending four days in the water, the five Mimixcoa were suckled by Mecitli, who, by the text, identifies with the Earth Goddess (Tlaltecuhtli or Coatlicue), and, immediately, the Sun ordered the 400 Mimixcoa; the Sun, Tonatiuh, gives them arrows and says

Here it is with what they will serve me to drink, with what they will feed, and a shield, and the precious arrows cast in quetzal feathers, in heron-rowing feathers, in feathers of zacuam, in tlauhquechol feathers, and in xiuhtototl feathers; and also, she, the Earth (Tlaltecuhtli or Coatlicue), who is your mother

but the Centzon Mimixcoa did not do their duty; instead, they get drunk on tzihuactli wine - a small maguey and have sex with women, and immediately, the Sun also orders the five who were born last, immediately gives them the maguey arrow and gives them the divine shield. The five Mimixcoa climb a mesquite tree where the 400 discover them, and they exclaim: "Who are these who are such as us?", and then the five hide in specific places: Cuauhtlicoauh takes shelter in a tree, Mixcoatl on the ground, Tlotepe in the mount, Apantecuhtli in the water, and Cuitlachcihuatl in a court of the Tlachtli ball-court. Finally, the Centzon Mimixcoa are defeated by his five younger brothers, who served the Sun, Tonatiuh, and gave him a drink.

Anciently, in the North, there was a place of origins called Chicomoztoc, the seven caves. Within these caverns lived the Four Hundred Mimixcoa, a turbulent group of titans born of the Earth Goddess (Tlaltecuhtli or Coatlicue). Their father, the Sun (Tonatiuh), taught them the use of weapons so they might hunt and supply their divine parents with nourishment, but the Mimixcoa in their arrogance defied their parents, lived wantonly, and drank a wine madre from cactus. In response to the situation, which became ever more unbearable, the Earth Mother bore five additional Mimixcoa who were destined to avenge; their father provided these late-born children sharper and more deadly. The leader of the group is a synoptic figure and includes them all, hence his name, Mixcoatl. In the myth, Tezcatlipoca is said to have changed himself into Mixcoatl in the second year after the great flood at the end of the fourth aeon when the sky crashed down up the earth. Acting then as Mixcoatl, the divine one proceeded to create fire by drilling with a stick into a fireboard. This was the first light for the Fifth Sun had not yet been created. The myth is evidently at pains to point out a fundamental relationship between the supreme god, Tezcatlipoca and Mixcoatl. Camaxtle-Mixcoatl, in fact, is a perfect replica of that god of the dawn in both his trappings as depicted in the codices and in his mythology, which makes him the father of Ce Acatl Topiltzin Quetzalcoatl.

— Burr Cartwright Brundage

The Aztec gods of the southern stars are the Centzonhuītznāhuah, according to the Florentine Codex.
