= Cōātlīcue =

Aztec mother goddess

Coatlicue
- Mother of the Gods; Goddess of Earth, Nature, Fertility, Life and Death
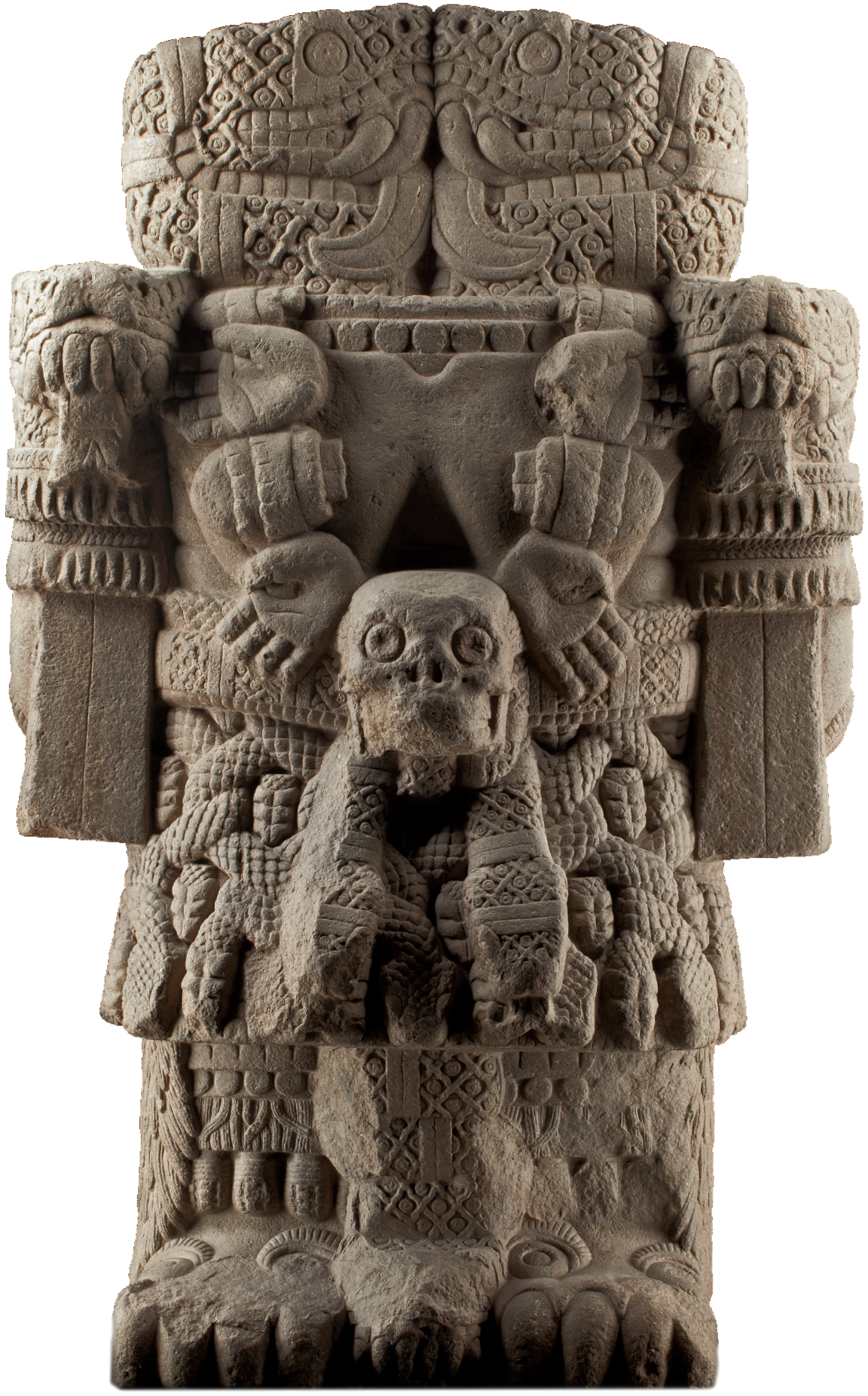
- Statue of Coatlicue displayed in the National Museum of Anthropology in Mexico City
- Other names: Tēteoh īnnan, "the deities, their mother"; Ilamatēuctli, "old mistress"; Tonāntzin, "our mother"; Tocih, "our grandmother"; Cōzcamiyāuh, "corn tassel necklace"; Cihuācōātl, "snake woman"; Cōātlāntonān, "our mother of Coatlan"
- Gender: Female
- Region: Mesoamerica
- Ethnic group: Aztec (Mexica)

Genealogy
- Parents: Tlaltecuhtli and Tlalcihuatl
- Siblings: Chimalma and Xochitlicue (Codex Ríos)
- Consort: Mixcoatl (Codex Florentine)
- Children: • With Mixcoatl: Huitzilopochtli, Coyolxauhqui and the Centzon Huitznahuac (Codex Florentine) • With Camaxtle-Mixcoatl or Tonatiuh: the Centzon Mimixcoa (Codex Ramirez)

Coatlicue (/kwɑːtˈliːkweɪ/; Classical Nahuatl: cōātl īcue, Nahuatl pronunciation: [koː(w)aːˈt͡ɬiːkʷeː], "skirt of snakes"), wife of Mixcōhuātl, also known as Tēteoh īnnān (pronounced [teːˈtéoʔˈíːnːaːn̥], "mother of the gods") is the Aztec goddess who gave birth to the moon, stars, and Huītzilōpōchtli, the god of the sun and war. The goddesses Toci "our grandmother" and Cihuacōātl "snake woman", the patron of women who die in childbirth, were also seen as aspects of Cōātlīcue.

== Etymology ==
The goddess' Classical Nahuatl name can be rendered both Cōātlīcue and Cōātl īcue, from cōātl "snake" and īcue "her skirt", roughly meaning "[she who has] the skirt of snakes". The name Tēteoh īnnān, from tēteoh, plural of teōtl "god", + īnnān "their mother", refers directly to her maternal role.

== Myths ==
Coatlicue is represented as a woman wearing a skirt of writhing snakes and a necklace made of human hearts, hands, and skulls. Her feet and hands are adorned with claws and her breasts are depicted as hanging flaccid from pregnancy. Her face is formed by two facing serpents, which represent blood spurting from her neck after she was decapitated.

According to Aztec mythology, the goddess Coatlicue became miraculously pregnant when a ball of feathers fell on her while she was sweeping a temple—an event that symbolizes divine conception and cosmic destiny. She was to give birth to Huitzilopochtli, the future god of war and the sun. Interpreting this as dishonor, her daughter Coyolxauhqui, along with her 400 brothers, plotted to kill her. Just as the attack began, Huitzilopochtli emerged fully armed from his mother, defeated his siblings, and cast Coyolxauhqui into the sky, where she became the moon. This myth represents the triumph of cosmic order over chaos and the daily rebirth of the sun.

Cecelia Klein argues that the famous Coatlicue statue in the National Museum of Anthropology in Mexico, and several other complete and fragmentary versions, may represent a personified snake skirt. The reference is to one version of the creation of the present Sun. The myth relates that the present Sun began after the deities gathered at Teotihuacan and sacrificed themselves. The best-known version states that Tezzictecatl and Nanahuatzin immolated themselves, becoming the moon and the sun. However, other versions add a group of women to those who sacrificed themselves, including Coatlicue. Afterward, the Aztecs were said to have worshiped the skirts of these women, which came back to life. Coatlicue thus has creative aspects, which may balance the skulls, hearts, hands, and claws that connect her to the earth deity Tlaltecuhtli. The earth both consumes and regenerates life.
