= Centzonhuītznāhua =

Aztec gods of the southern stars

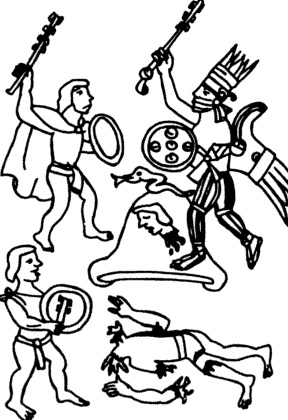
Huītzilōpōchtli killing Centzonhuītznāhua as depicted in the Florentine Codex

In Aztec mythology, the Centzonhuītznāhua (Nahuatl pronunciation: [sent͡sonwiːtsˈnaːwa] or, the plural, Centzon Huītznāuhtin, [sent͡sonwiːtsˈnaːwtin]) were the gods of the southern stars. These "four hundred" (i.e. innumerable) brothers appear in some versions of the origin story of Huītzilōpōchtli, the god of the sun and war. In these myths, the Centzonhuītznāhua and their sister Coyolxāuhqui feel dishonored upon learning that their mother, the goddess Cōātlīcue, had become impregnated by a ball of feathers that she had tucked into her bodice. The children conspire to kill their mother, but their plan is thwarted when, upon approaching their mother, Huītzilōpōchtli sprang from the womb—fully grown and garbed for battle—and killed them. Huītzilōpōchtli beheaded his sister Coyolxāuhqui, who became the moon. Huītzilōpōchtli chased after his brothers, who, in fleeing their brother, became scattered all over the sky.

The Centzonhuītznāhua are known as the "Four Hundred Southerners"; the gods of the northern stars are the Centzonmīmixcōa.
