= Disk of Mictlāntēcutli =

Aztec sculpture

- El Disco de la Muerte
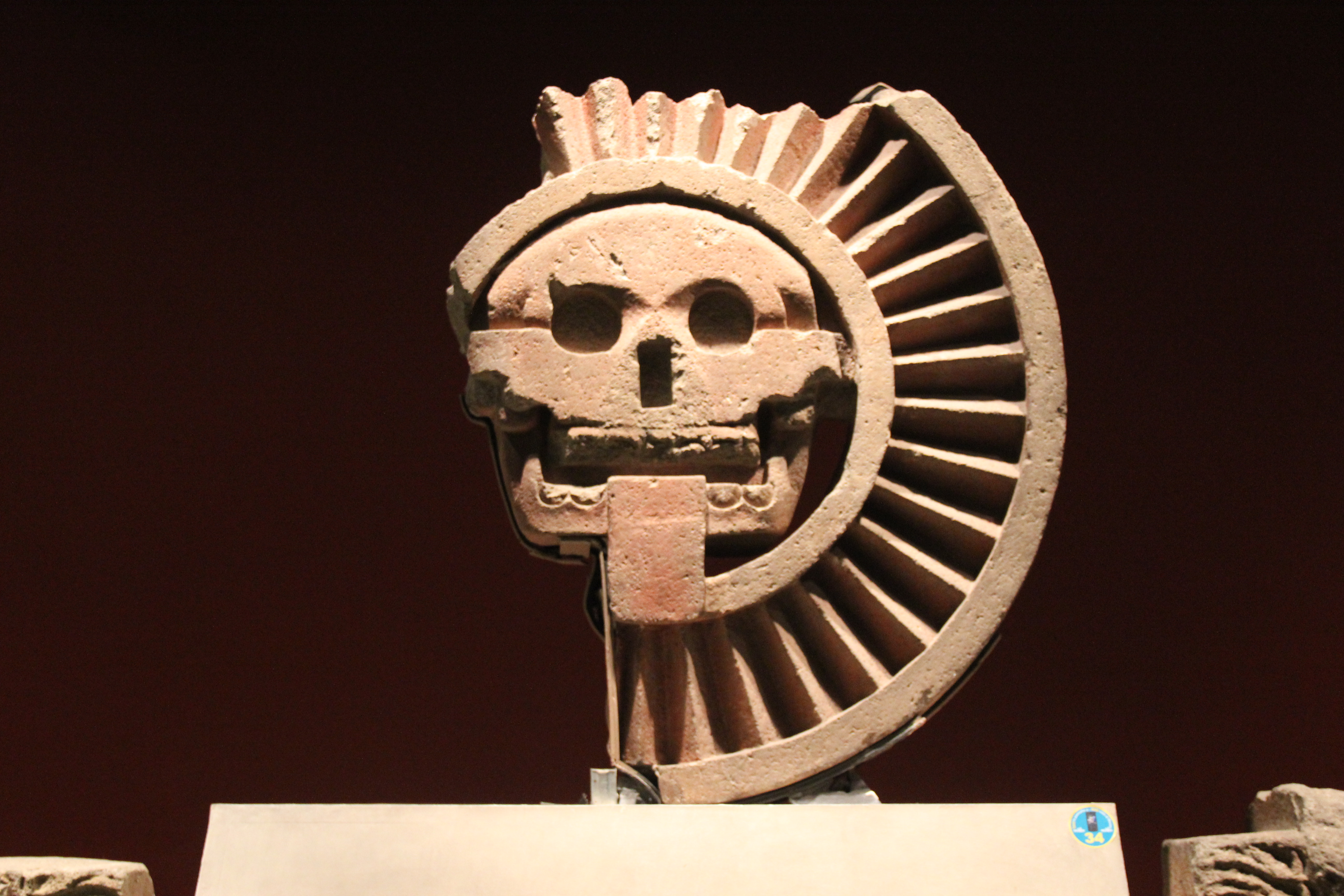
- Material: Basalt
- Length: 102 cm (40 in)
- Height: 126 cm (50 in)
- Width: 102 cm (40 in)
- Discovered: 1963; Teotihuacan
- Discovered by: Archaeologists
- Present location: National Museum of Anthropology
- Culture: Aztec

The Disk of Mictlāntēcutli (Nahuatl: [mik.t͡ɬaːn.ˈteːkʷ.t͡ɬi]), otherwise known as the Disk of Death, is a pre-Hispanic sculpture depicting Mictlāntēcutli, the Aztec god of death and ruler of Mictlān, the underworld of Aztec mythology. Archaeologists found the artwork in Teotihuacan's Pyramid of the Sun in 1963. The basaltic rock disk is partly destroyed. The disk was created between 1 CE and 600 CE. The sculpture features a skull with the tongue out and is surrounded by a pleated paper headdress.

For the Aztecs, Teotihuacan was the place where the Fifth Sun was born. They conducted pilgrimages from Tenochtitlan to honor the city and leave gifts, which included the disk. The meaning of the sculpture is uncertain, although archaeologists do not rule out the possibility that it alludes to sun death or human sacrifice.

The piece is on display at Mexico City's National Museum of Anthropology in the Teotihuacan exhibition.
