= National Museum of Anthropology (Mexico) =

Archeological museum in Mexico City, Mexico

- Museo Nacional de Antropología (Spanish)

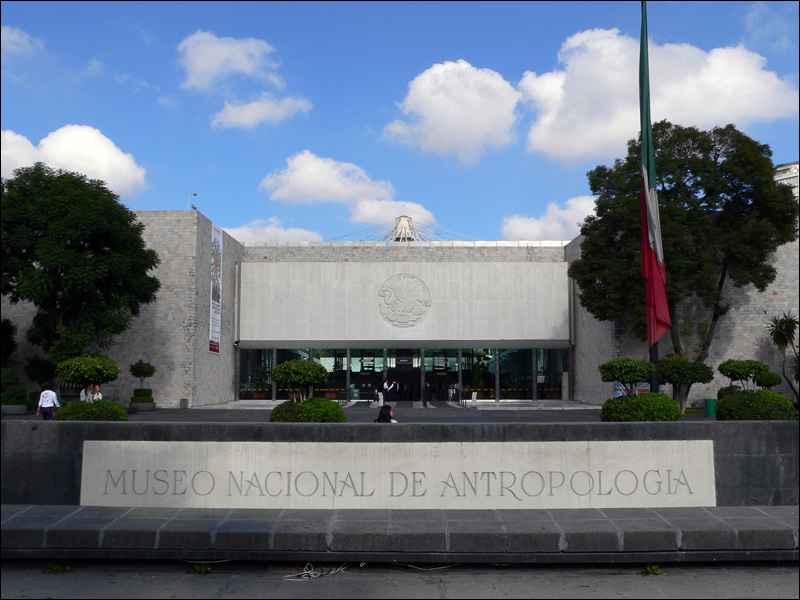
- The museum's front entrance in 2006
- Interactive fullscreen map
- Established: 1964
- Location: Mexico City, Mexico
- Coordinates: 19°25′34″N 99°11′10″W
- Type: Archaeology museum
- Collection size: 600,000
- Visitors: 3,700,000 (2024)
- Public transit access: Auditorio Station (line 7)
- Website: mna.inah.gob.mx

The National Museum of Anthropology (Spanish: Museo Nacional de Antropología, MNA) is a national museum of Mexico. It is the largest and most visited museum in Mexico. Located in the area between Paseo de la Reforma and Mahatma Gandhi Street within Chapultepec Park in Mexico City, which is a wide-open natural park and has a great history, because it was the place where Aztec emperors spent time. The museum contains significant archaeological and anthropological artifacts from Mexico's pre-Columbian heritage, such as the Stone of the Sun (or the Aztec calendar stone) and the Aztec Xochipilli statue.

The museum received 3,700,000 visitors in 2024, making it the most-visited museum in Mexico, and the 17th most-visited museum of the arts in the world.

The museum (along with many other Mexican national and regional museums) is managed by the Instituto Nacional de Antropología e Historia (National Institute of Anthropology and History), or INAH. It was one of several museums opened by Mexican President Adolfo López Mateos in 1964.

Assessments of the museum vary, with one considering it "a national treasure and a symbol of identity. The museum is the synthesis of an ideological, scientific, and political feat." Octavio Paz criticized the museum's making the Mexica (Aztec) hall central, saying the "exaltation and glorification of Mexico-Tenochtitlan transforms the Museum of Anthropology into a temple."

== Architecture ==
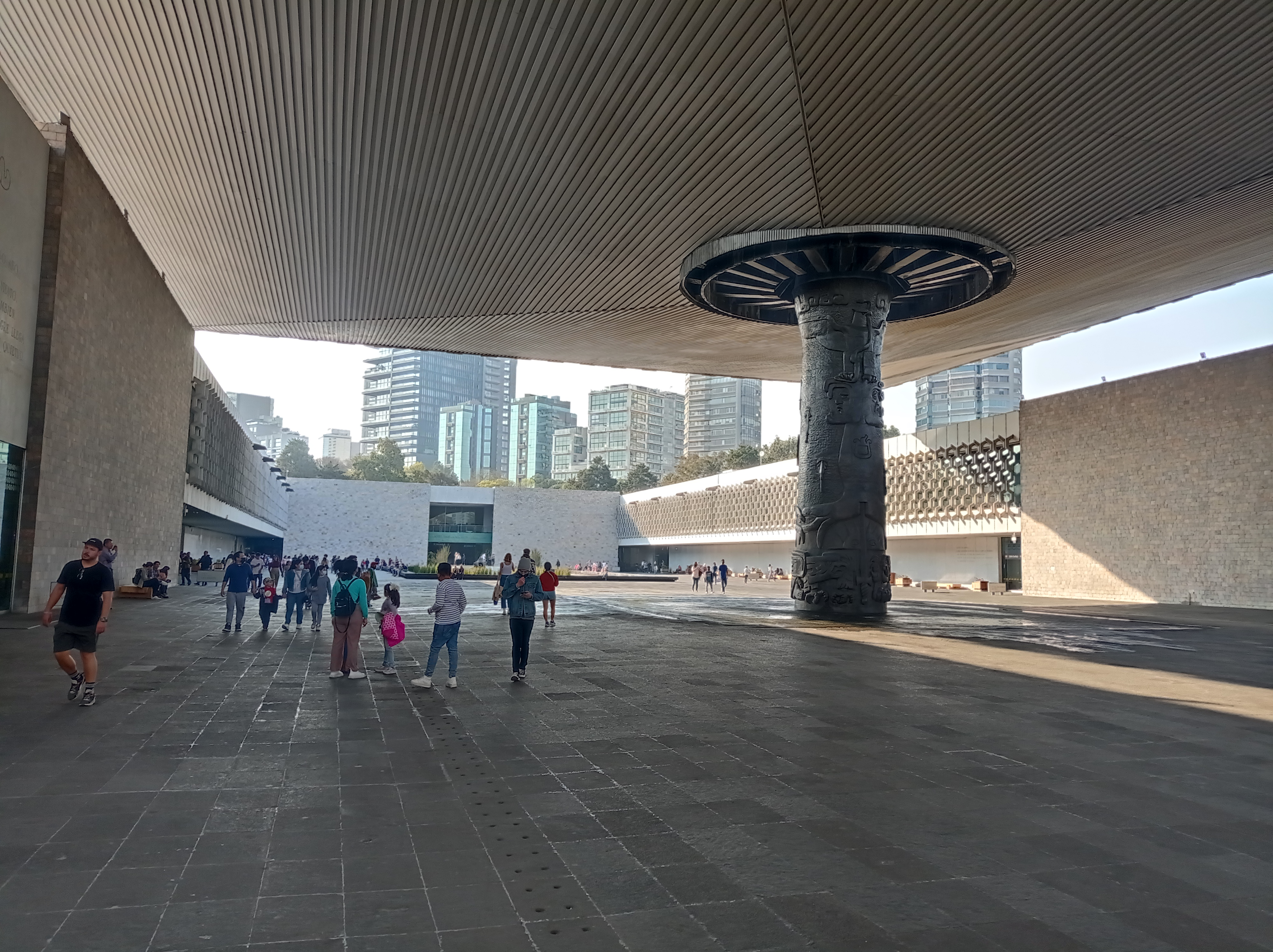
The Central Courtyard Umbrella

Designed in 1964 by Pedro Ramírez Vázquez, Jorge Campuzano, and Rafael Mijares Alcérreca. As the authors mentioned in "B. Pedro Ramírez Vázquez, Museo Nacional de Antropología, Mexico City" which is part of "Modern Architecture in Latin America" book, Pedro Ramírez Vázquez is a well-known architect, who graduated from UNAM'S School of Architecture, known for designing several buildings such as Secretarìa de Trabajo, Mercado de Coyoacάn, Mexico's pavilions, Museum of Modern Art in Mexico, and National Museum of Anthropology.

Luis Castañeda mentioned in the article "Beyond Tlatelolco: Design, Media, and Politics at Mexico ’68" that during the design phase the designers visited museums in other countries to take some inspiration. For example, the courtyard was derived from the neoclassical rotunda of John Russel Pope which is in the National Gallery of Art in Washington.The monumental building contains exhibition halls surrounding a courtyard with a huge pond and a vast square concrete umbrella supported by a single slender pillar (known as "el paraguas", Spanish for "the umbrella"). Nature was included in the museum through the courtyard.The halls are ringed by gardens, many of which contain outdoor exhibits. The museum has 23 rooms for exhibits and covers an area of 79,700 square meters (almost 8 hectares) or 857,890 square feet (almost 20 acres). According to Ramírez Vázquez in his book "The National Museum of Anthropology: Mexico: Art, Architecture, Archaeology, Anthropology", the architects' goal was to design a functional space that is also related to the Mexican culture. In other words, it symbolizes and represents Mexican's history and origin, so that it reveals what being a Mexican means and creates a sense of connectivity to the country.

This sense is revealed through the interesting historical ornaments like Maya ornamentation, and the traditional materials like the lava rock. Also, an inspiration is taken from Mayan architecture, such as the steel tracery on the courtyard's walls and the "quadrangle layout", which is having a flow between the buildings that surround the patio through their openings and doorways, creating connection between interior and exterior spaces. Moreover, many artists added their artistical touches to the design such as the mural at the entrance to the auditorium, stained glass, and tapestry mural. The rooms of the museums surround the central courtyard, creating an interesting experience for the visitors while moving in the museum. They were not only designed by the architect Ramírez Vázquez, but also by group of historians, artists, designers, and museum curators. Mathias Goeritz is one of the artists who contributed in designing the museum's interior by mixing traditional and modern elements, which made him closer to the official art circle in Mexico, because at the beginning he preferred only modern art and not the traditional one. He created large textile murals for Mexico's Huichol people. What makes that museum more special is the mix between local and universal culture, which is also performed at Ramírez's pavilions. This is shown through using the brick and stone with steel.

The museum has 2 floors built around the central courtyard, where the ground floor reveals the ancient and historic civilizations, and the upper floor groups the archeology together with the ethnography and anthropology showing how the indigenous groups live. The intent in this museum was to create a cohesive flow having a sense of comfortability and privacy for the visitors while they circulate in it, they can feel the variety while moving from the exhibition rooms to larger spaces. This can create an emotional experience while they are scientifically exploring the relics and work of art.

This interesting experience in the museum that has simple rectangular layout starts from the open entrance plaza and the natural vegetation from the courtyard to the most essential and largest exhibition hall "Mexica Room". Before entering to the exhibit rooms, there is an enclosed roofed lobby. It directs visitors to other rooms after welcoming them and introducing them to the museum. After this, there is a central patio that has 2 parts, one of them is a partially open space where the giant umbrella roof is built with the same width and materials as the lobby and entrance plaza. It is a space where visitors feel sheltered and protected from the harsh environmental conditions but not fully enclosed at the same time. It is elevated more than the other walls and has an opening through the column holding it, so that the rain is not accumulated above it. It is made out of reinforced concrete covered in aluminum, and there is decorative carvings on the column made by Chávez Morado who contributed in designing the murals for Brussel pavilion. The other part of the central patio is open and has a pool connected to the Mexica Room, highlighting its importance and symbolizing the lake origin of the Aztec culture.

The Mexica Room is made out of gray floors, Santo Tomas marble, white marble, aluminum, and glass, which are used for the previous architectural features as well. The huge umbrella has steel structure covered with wood and filled with reinforced concrete. The area of the roof is approximately 265 by 175, strengthened by cables that are expanded from the column. The interesting fact is that this roof is the hugest one around the world and supported by one column only.

While the director was finishing some tasks like moving the artifacts to the museum, preparing the electrical equipment, and performing some studies, the construction process was going on, and it took nineteen months. New construction techniques and pre-Hispanic ones were used. The museum was built using developed engineering and construction techniques, so the historical pieces can be shown ideally and effectively, having a great emotional impact on people. Also, the umbrella and the exhibit rooms were built before the other programs in the building to ensure moving the heavy machines easily.

While structuring the museum, many aspects like spatial, aesthetics, and seismic conditions were taken into consideration. Prefabricated steel pieces were used to build the two-story building, the floor above the lobby area was supported on trusses that prevent the load from being transferred to the thin columns. On the first floor, the ceiling is two floor level and the part where there is low ceiling is the area for introducing the exhibits. Large dramatic exhibits are presented in double story part.

== History ==
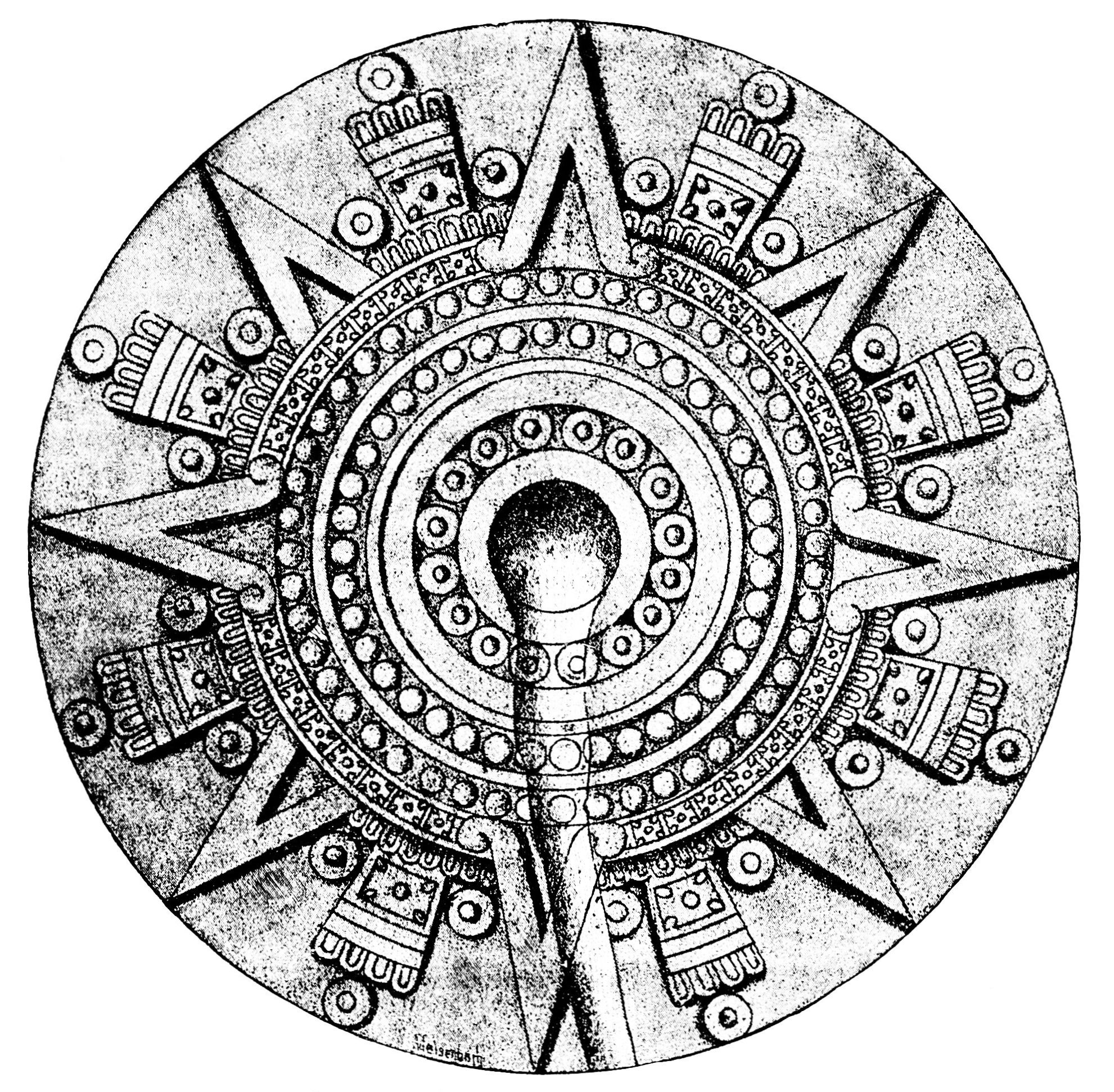
Top View of the Stone of Tizoc. The stone is currently in the National Museum of Anthropology.

At the end of the 18th century, by order of the viceroy of Bucareli, the items that formed part of the collection by Lorenzo Boturini — including the sculptures of Coatlicue and the Sun Stone — were placed in the Royal and Pontifical University of Mexico, forming the core of the collection that would become the National Museum of Anthropology.

On August 25, 1790, the Cabinet of Curiosities of Mexico (Gabinete de Historia Natural de México) (Note: This early cabinet of curiosities, Gabinete de Historia Natural de México, became years later the nowadays Museo de Historia Natural in Mexico City.) was established by botanist José Longinos Martínez. During the 19th century, the museum was visited by internationally renowned scholars such as Alexander von Humboldt. In 1825, the first Mexican president, Guadalupe Victoria, advised by the historian Lucas Alamán, established the National Mexican Museum as an autonomous institution. In 1865, the Emperor Maximilian moved the museum to Calle de Moneda 13, to the former location of the Casa de Moneda.

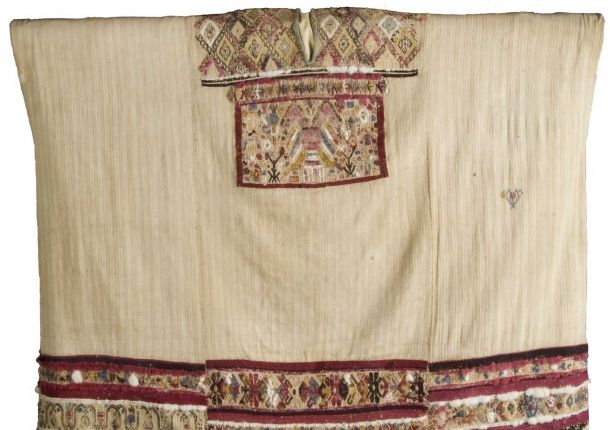
The "La Malinche" huipil it is made of cotton with feathers, wax and gold thread. The design is dominated by an image of a double headed eagle, showing both indigenous and Spanish influence. It is part of the collection of the Museo Nacional de Antropología.

In 1906, due to the growth of the museum's collections, Justo Sierra divided the stock of the National Museum. The natural history collections were moved to the Chopo building, which was constructed specifically to shelter permanent expositions. The museum was renamed the National Museum of Archaeology, History and Ethnography, and was re-opened September 9, 1910, in the presence of President Porfirio Díaz. By 1924 the stock of the museum had increased to 52,000 objects and had received more than 250,000 visitors.

In December 1940, the museum was divided again, with its historical collections being moved to the Chapultepec Castle, where they formed the Museo Nacional de Historia, focusing on the Viceroyalty of the New Spain and its progress towards modern Mexico. The remaining collection was renamed the National Museum of Anthropology, focusing on pre-Columbian Mexico and modern day Mexican ethnography.

The construction of the contemporary museum building began in February 1963 in the Chapultepec park. The project was coordinated by architect Pedro Ramírez Vázquez, with assistance by Rafael Mijares Alcérreca and Jorge Campuzano. The construction of the building lasted 19 months, and was inaugurated on September 17, 1964, President Adolfo López Mateos, who declared:

The Mexican people lift this monument in honor of the admirable cultures that flourished during the Pre-Columbian period in regions that are now territory of the Republic. In front of the testimonies of those cultures, the Mexico of today pays tribute to the indigenous people of Mexico, in whose example we recognize characteristics of our national originality.

According to Noemí Castillo-Tejero in the article "Keeping a record of the cultural heritage in the National Museum of Anthropology, Mexico City", Instituto Nacional de Antropología e Historia (INAH) is a federal government that protects the archeological heritage by implementing laws, creating museums, and initiating systems to manage the collection. One of the laws is the Federal Law on Archeological, Historical and Artistic Monuments and Zones (1972), which prohibited private ownership and selling the products that are created by the indigenous cultures before the coming of the Spanish, and stated that they are considered archeological monuments. After constructing the museum, INAH started organizing new accurate systems which are beneficial for future researchers and include full records of the objects accessed digitally through a computer. After this, the Electronic Machines system was formed to develop the system and accelerated information control. Moreover, archeologists and IT specialists worked together to create terminological dictionaries that include systematic descriptions of objects to solve the inconsistency and subjectivity in old catalogue cards. Along with the dictionary, they prepared new catalogue cards. They have systematic information and sections coordinated with the dictionary and organized in alphabetical order. After this, coding systems were prepared to make processing easier, it was a flexible system that can create more than 40,000 different codes, and plenty of objects can be organized without the need to change the system in the future. Previously, the data was processed manually by tabulators and punched cards, and then it was changed to coded one, which lead to the growth of the museum's data bank. In addition, the Public Register of Archeological Zones and Monuments is one of the new departments created by INAH to track all the archeological objects in the country even the ones in private collections by using the same coded vocabularies as the Museum of Anthropology. They were always working on updating the dictionaries and having consistent information and well prepared for future digital processing.

On 25 December 1985, 124 artefacts were stolen from the museum by two veterinary students for unknown motives. Most of the pieces were recovered in 1989, while four remain missing. One of the thieves was arrested while the other remains at large. The events became the subject of the 2018 film Museo.

== Exhibits ==
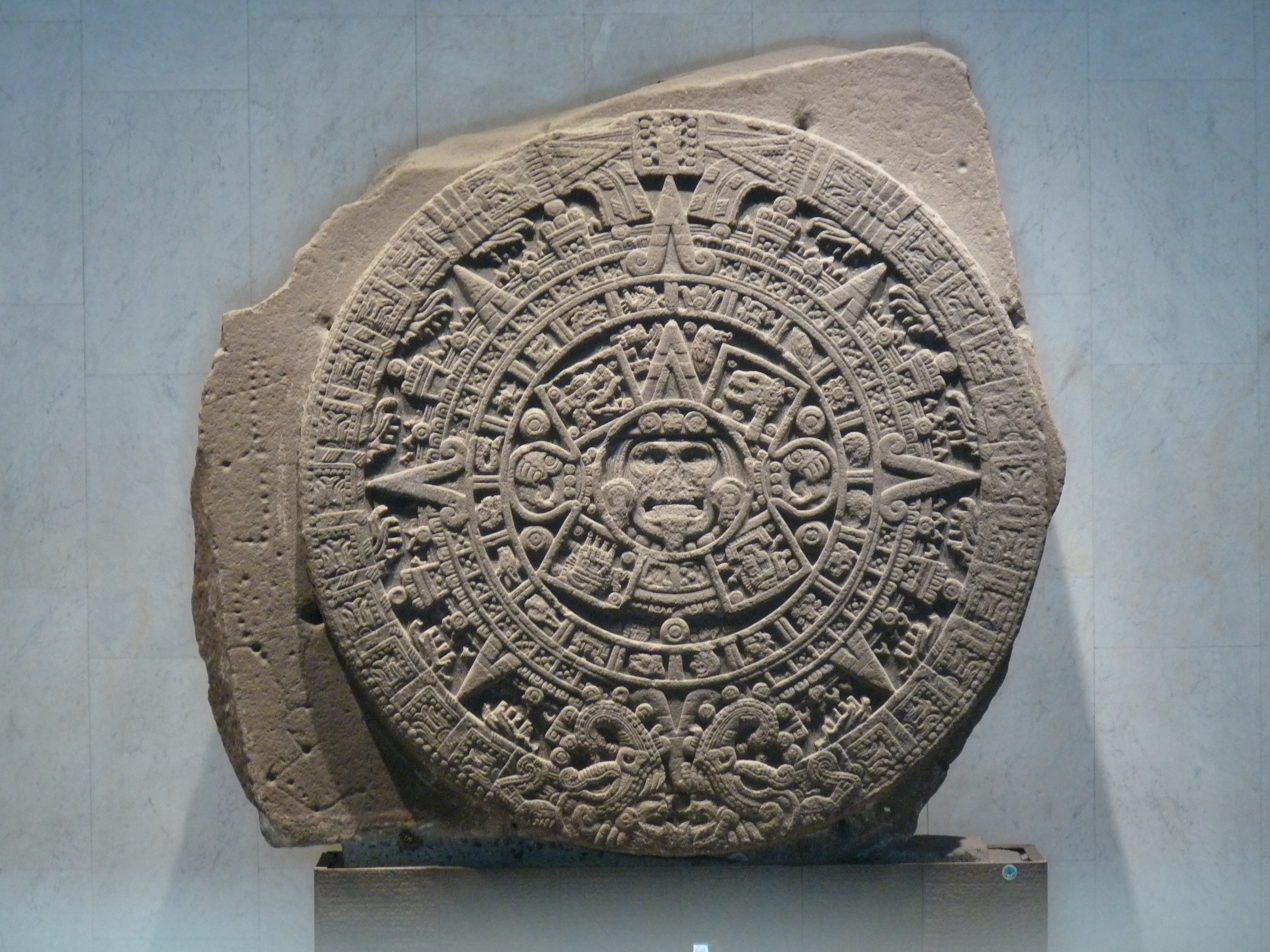
Original Aztec Sunstone is available for exhibit

The museum's collections include the Stone of the Sun, giant stone heads of the Olmec civilization that were found in the jungles of Tabasco and Veracruz, treasures recovered from the Maya civilization, at the Sacred Cenote at Chichen Itza, a replica of the sarcophagal lid from Pacal's tomb at Palenque and ethnological displays of contemporary rural Mexican life. It also has a model of the location and layout of the former Aztec capital Tenochtitlan, the site of which is now occupied by the central area of modern-day Mexico City.

The permanent exhibitions on the ground floor cover all pre-Columbian civilizations located on the current territory of Mexico as well as in former Mexican territory in what is today the southwestern United States. They are classified as North, West, Maya, Gulf of Mexico, Oaxaca, Mexico, Toltec, and Teotihuacan. The permanent expositions at the first floor show the culture of Native American population of Mexico since the Spanish colonization.

According to Marley Brown in the magazine article "Set in Stone", "La Señora de Amajac" is a statue of 6.5 feet height woman, the farmers found it in citrus grove in January 2021. It is wearing long skirt and loincloth, necklace that has an oval pendant made out of limpet shell, big scarf, and arm beads, which shows that it represents the Huastecs. They settled along the Gulf Coast of Mexico. "Huastec" is also the local language that is still spoken nowadays by some people in the area. So that statue is one of the greatest representations for the Huastec, where it reflects their social and political thoughts and beliefs, and culture. The Huastecs were connected to other cultures across Mesoamerica and influenced by them, and this is shown from how the statue is displayed because it is placed between pieces of art that are made by them.

The museum also hosts visiting exhibits, generally focusing on other of the world's great cultures. Past exhibits have focused on ancient Iran, Greece, China, Egypt, Russia, and Spain.

== Exhibits gallery ==
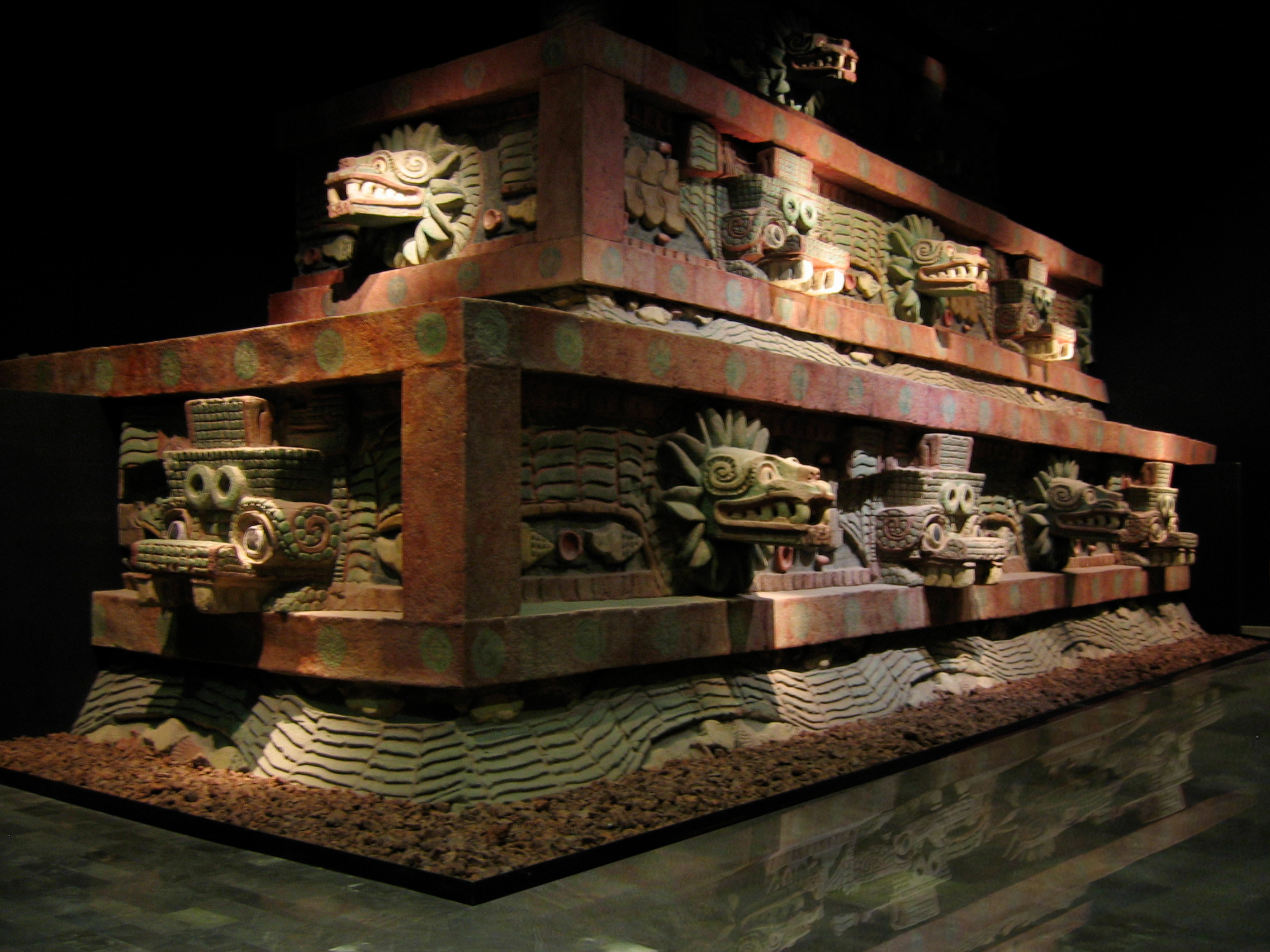
Reproduction of the Temple of the feathered serpent in Teotihuacan

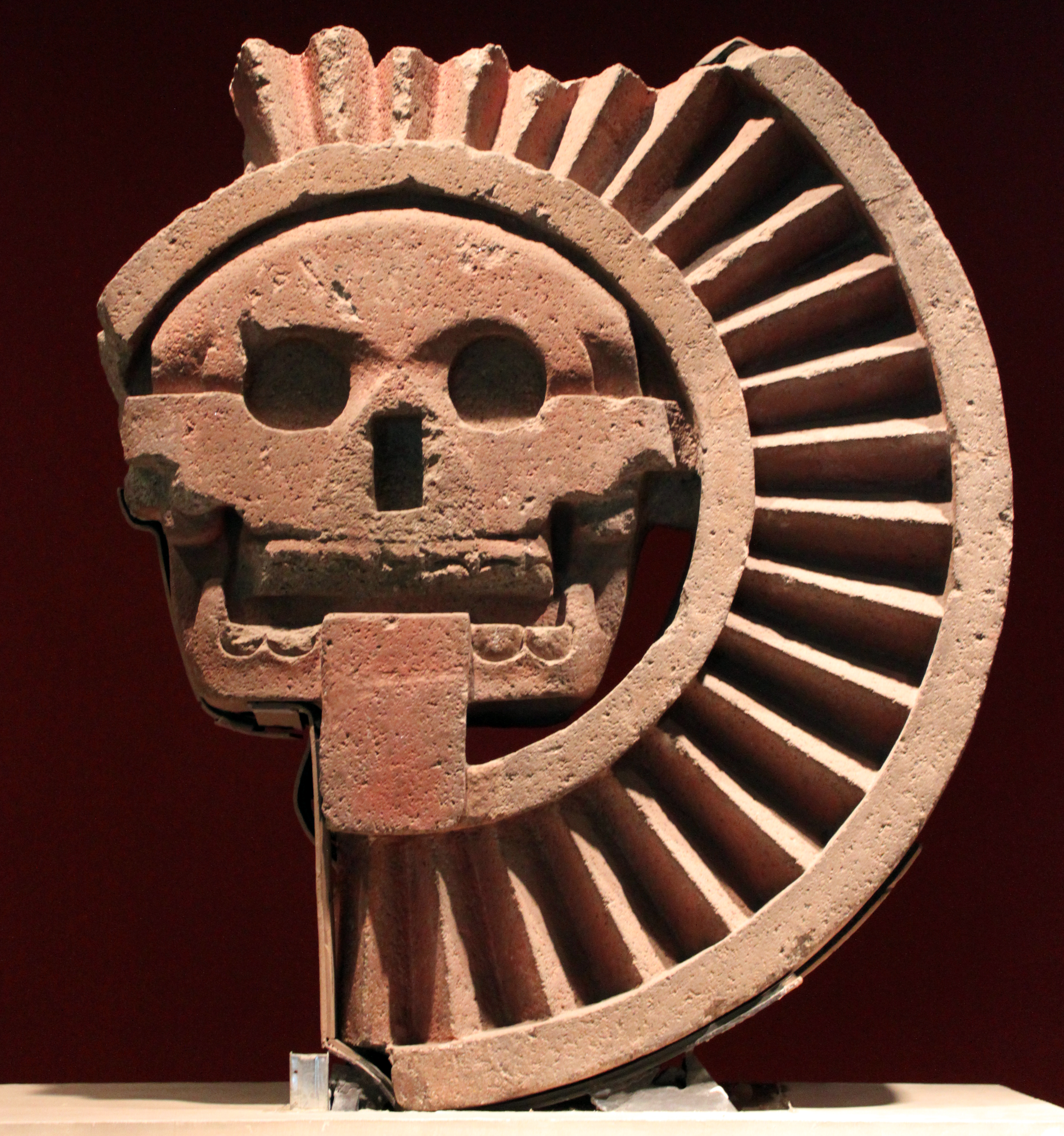
Disk of Mictlāntēcutli

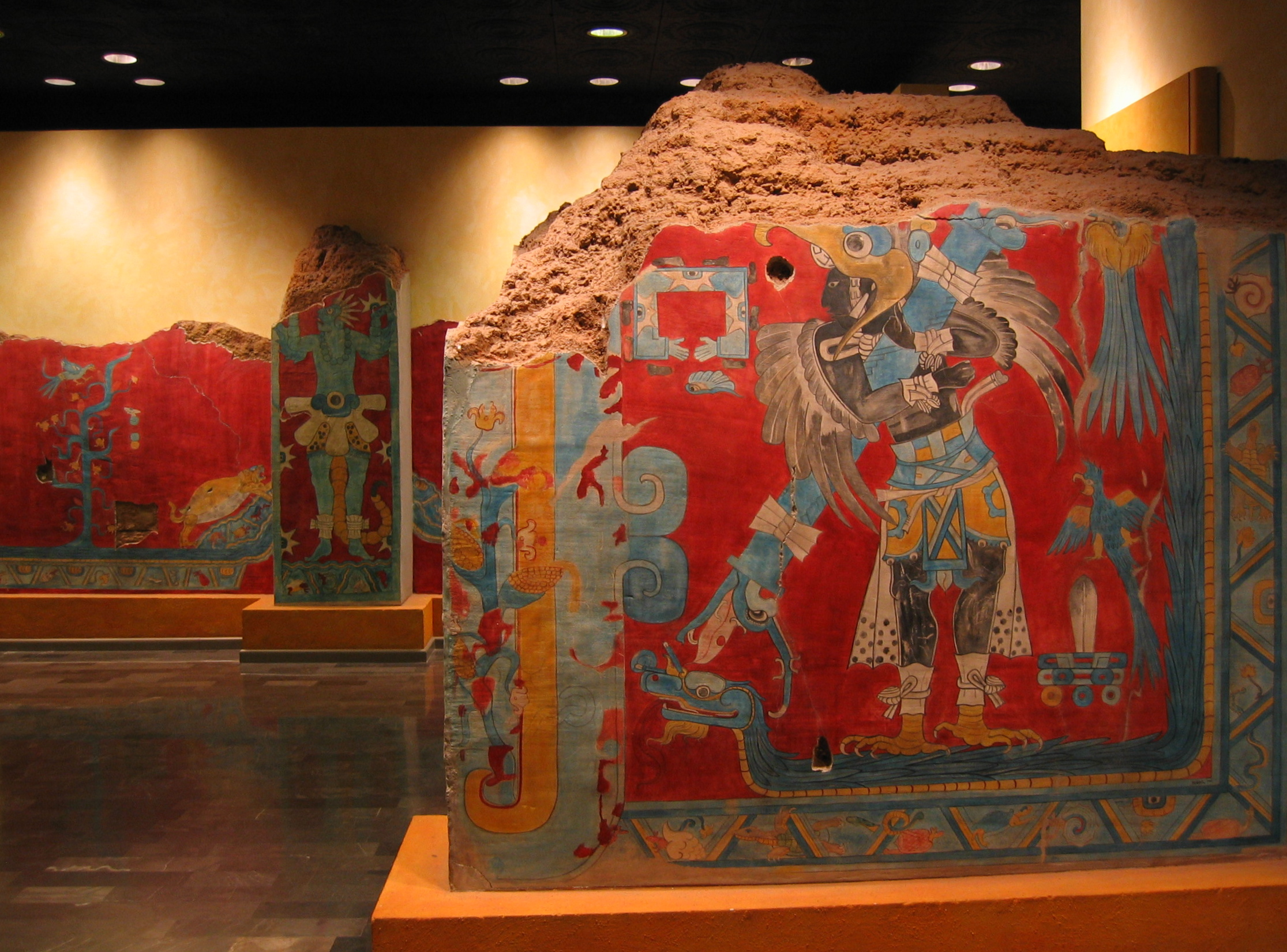
Olmeca-Xicallanca - Cacaxtla bird man mural

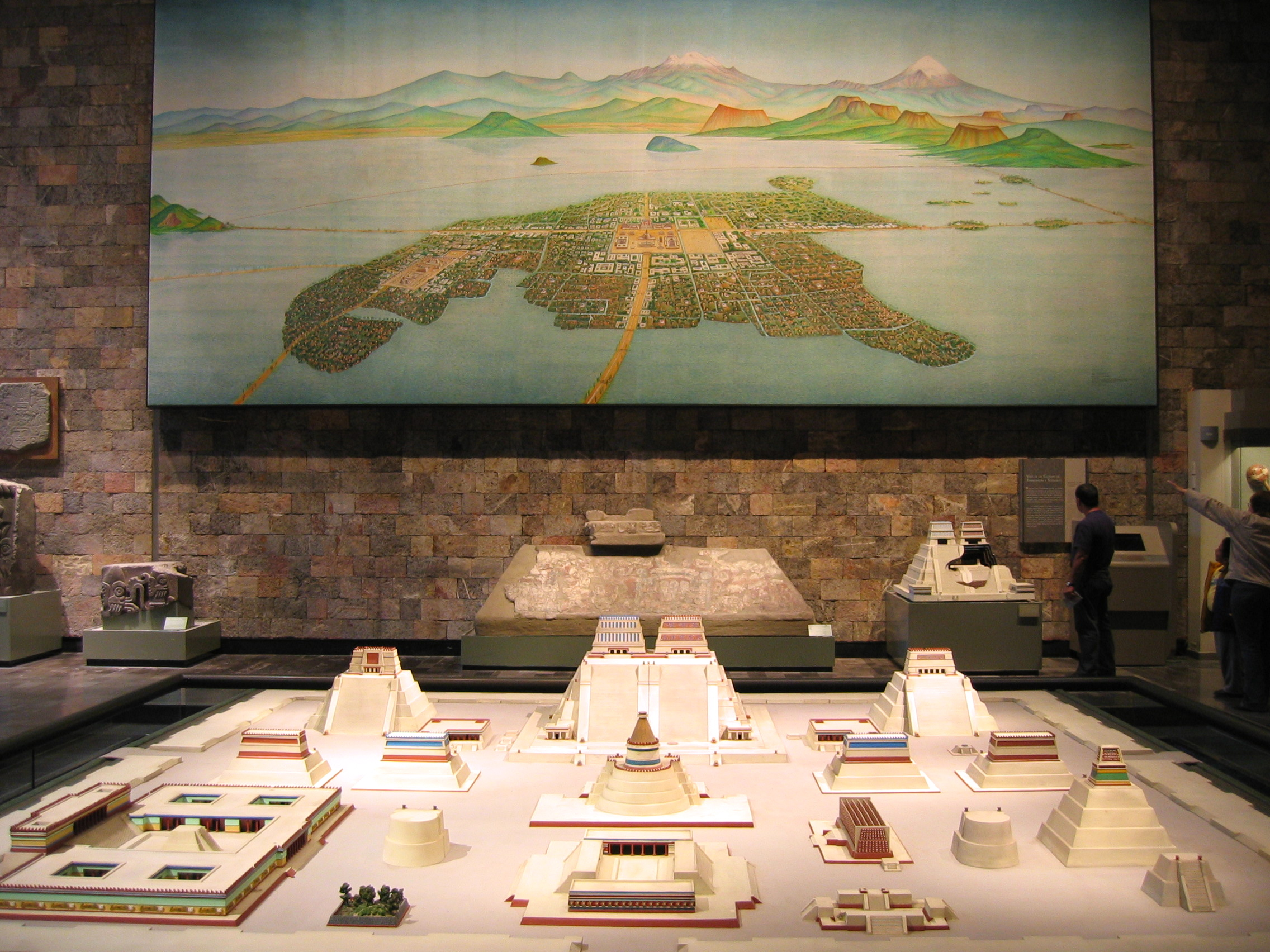
Mural and model of Tenochtitlan, looking east

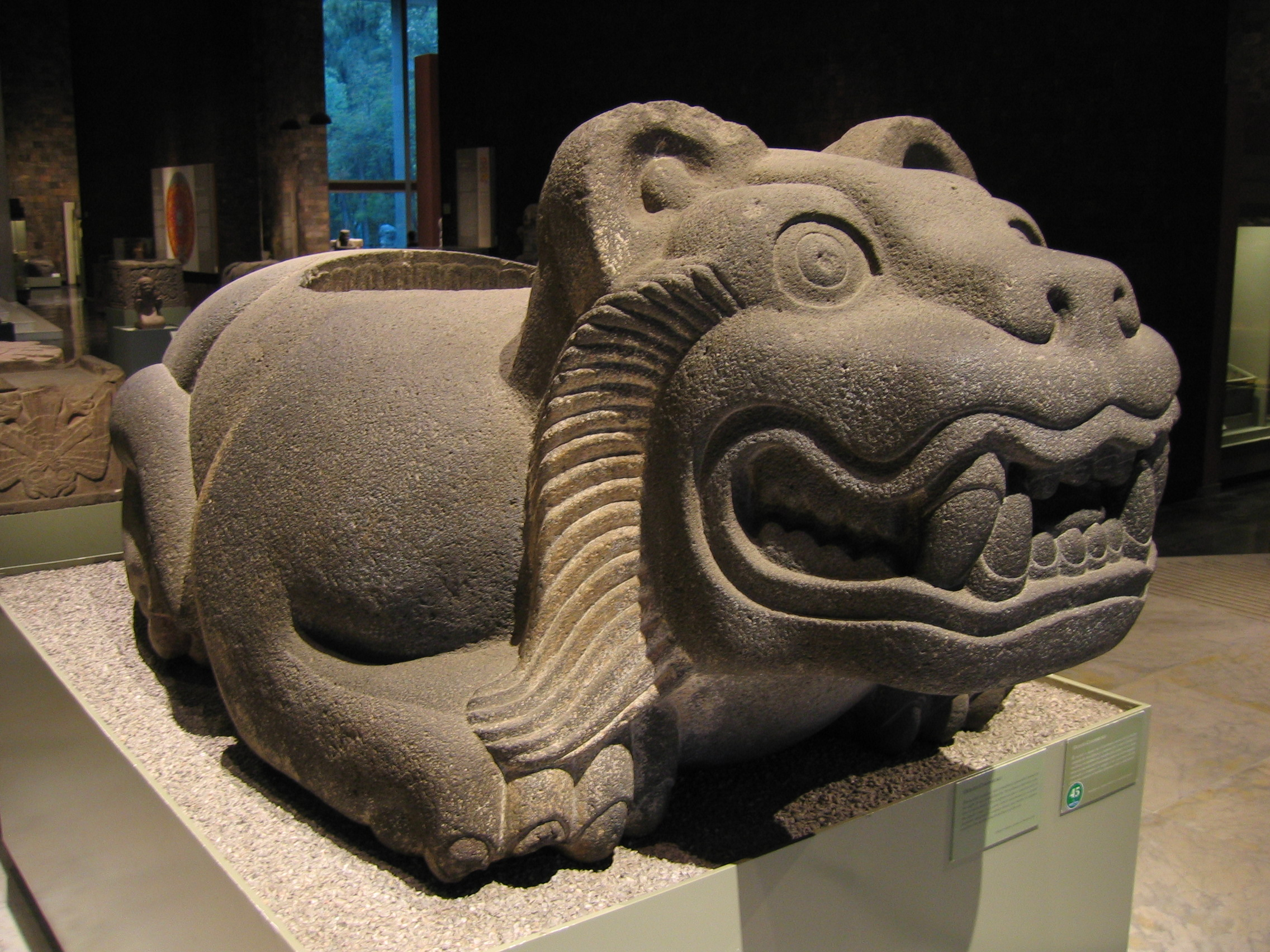
Ocelotl-Cuauhxicalli

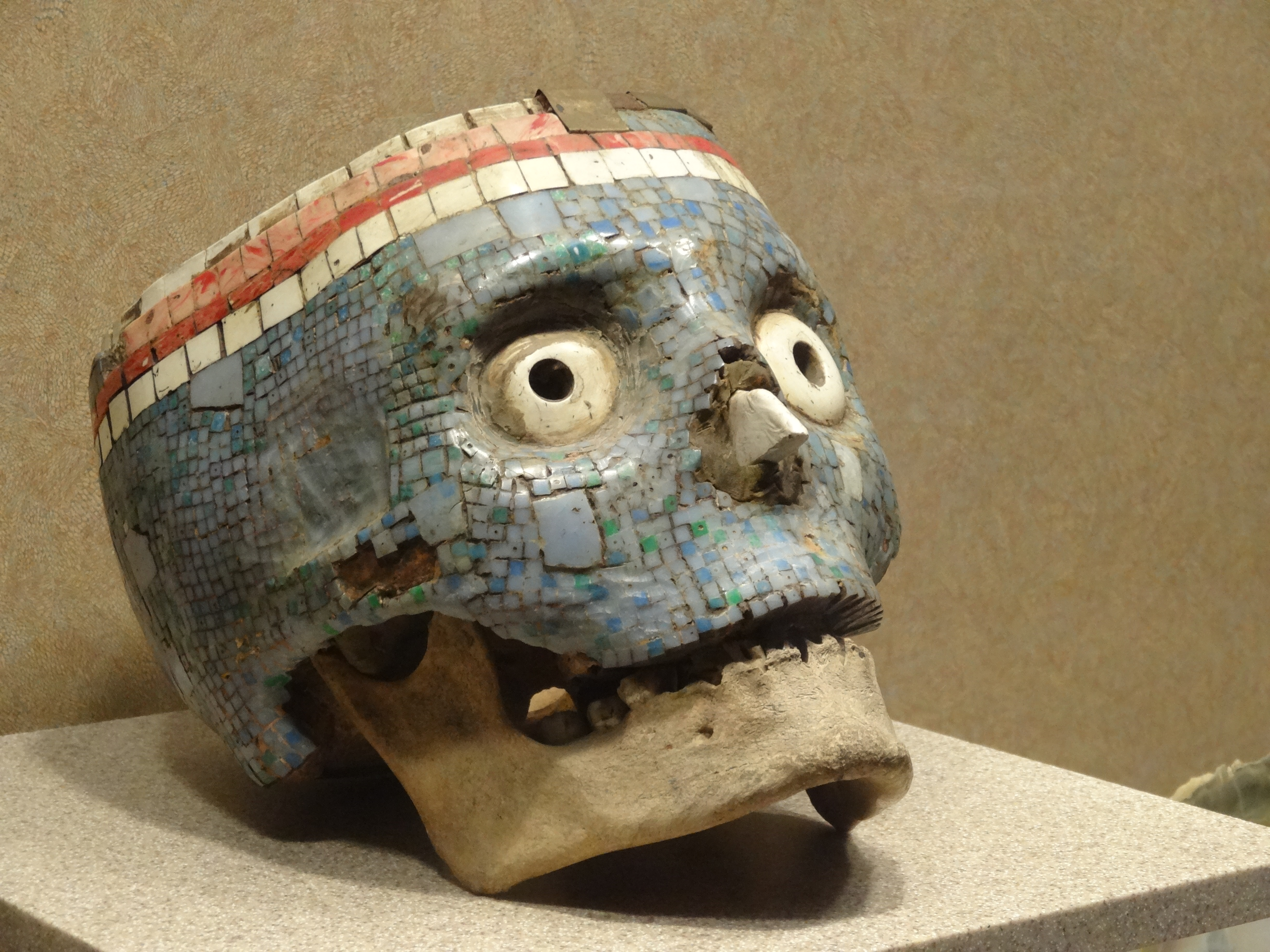
Skull covered with turquoise

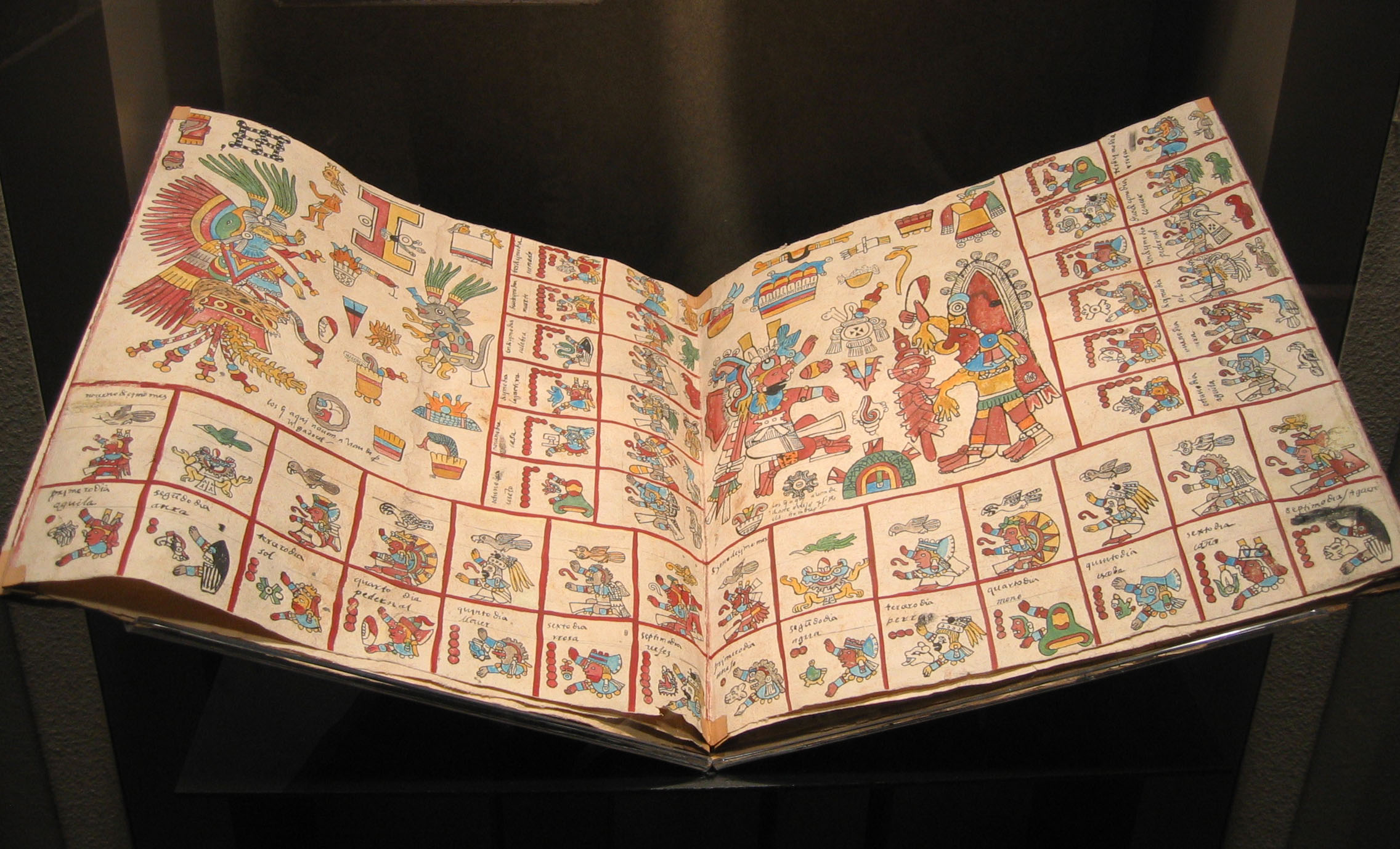
Replica of Codex Borbonicus

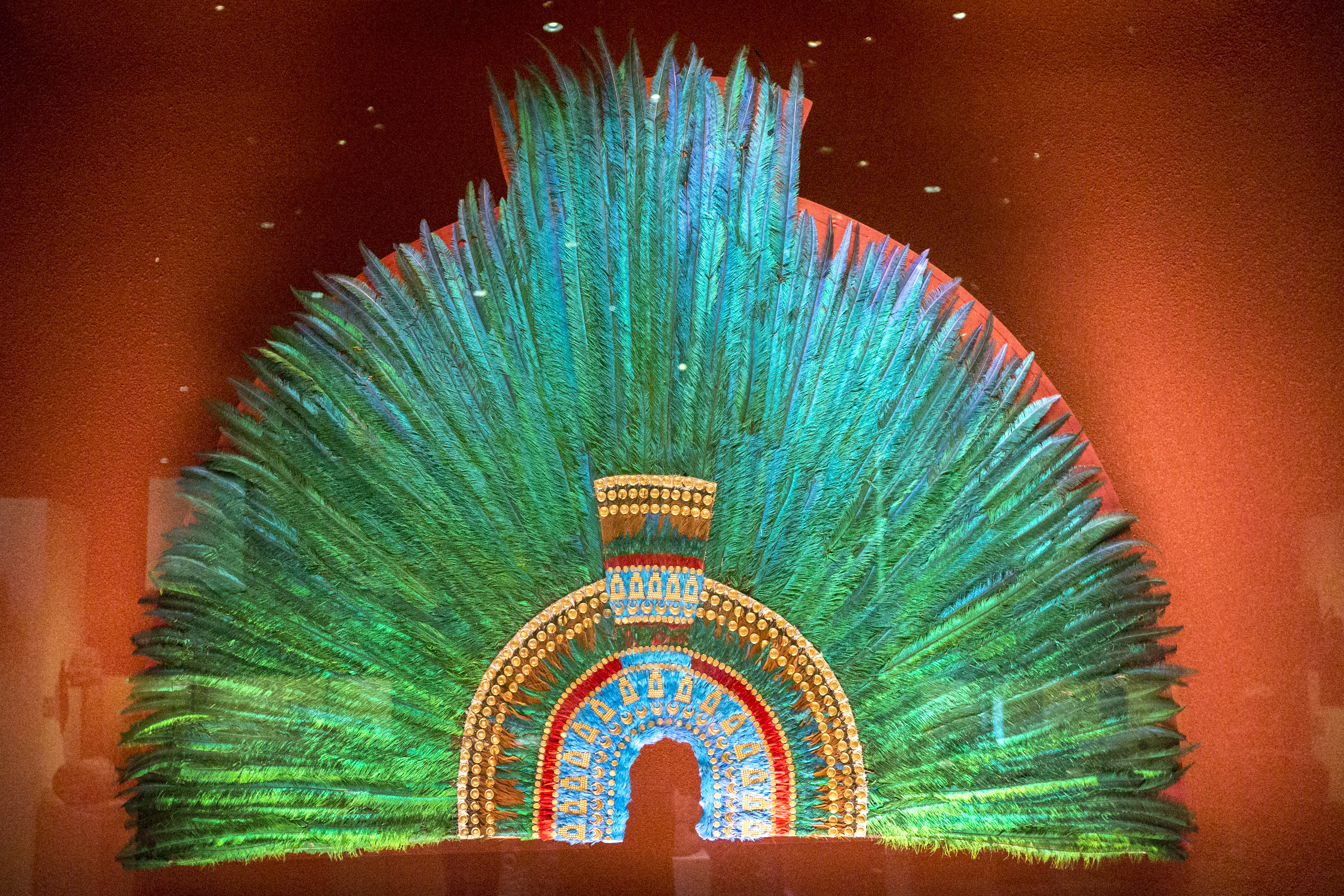
Replica of feather headdress of Moctezuma II

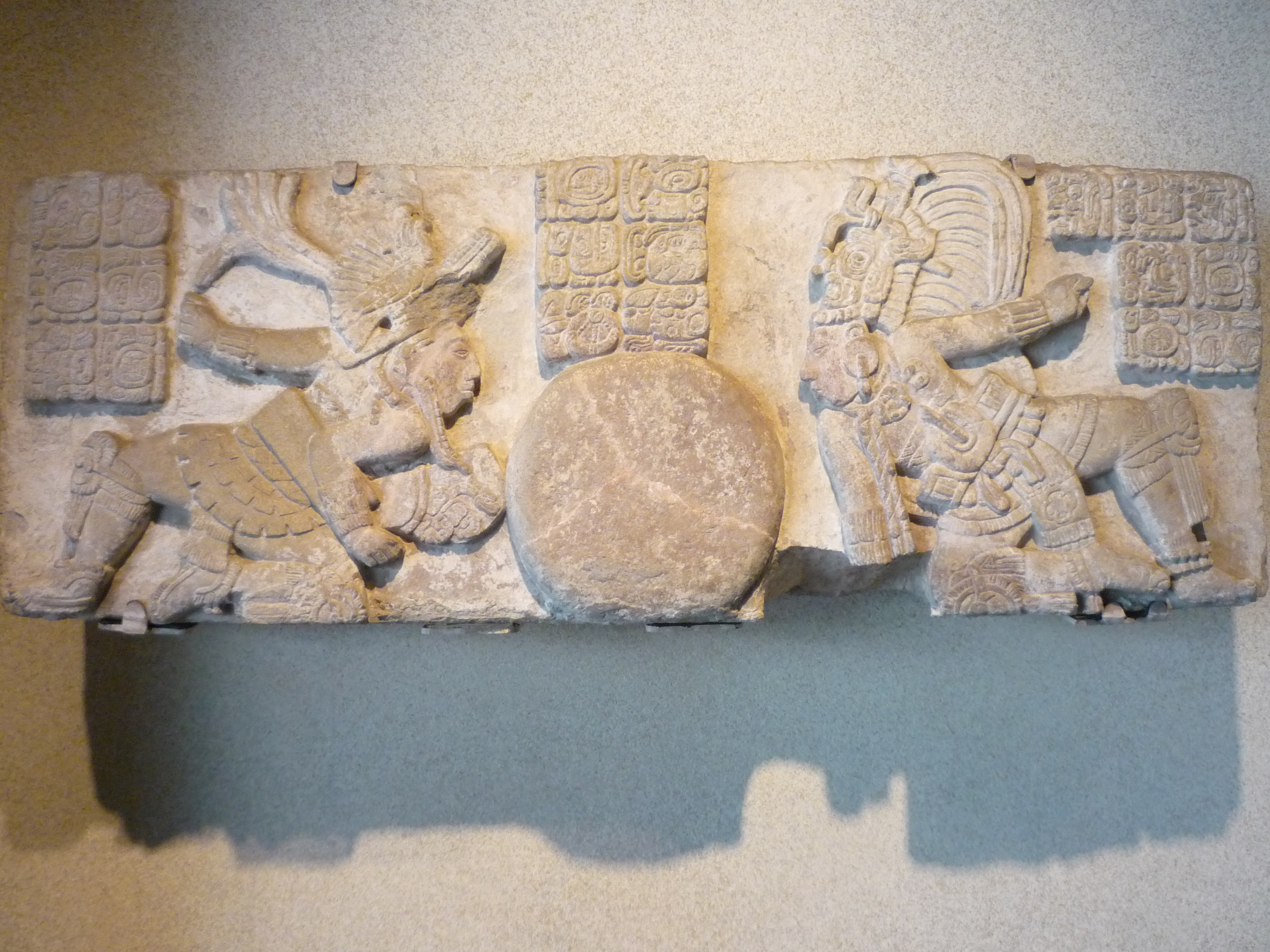
Relief of Toniná

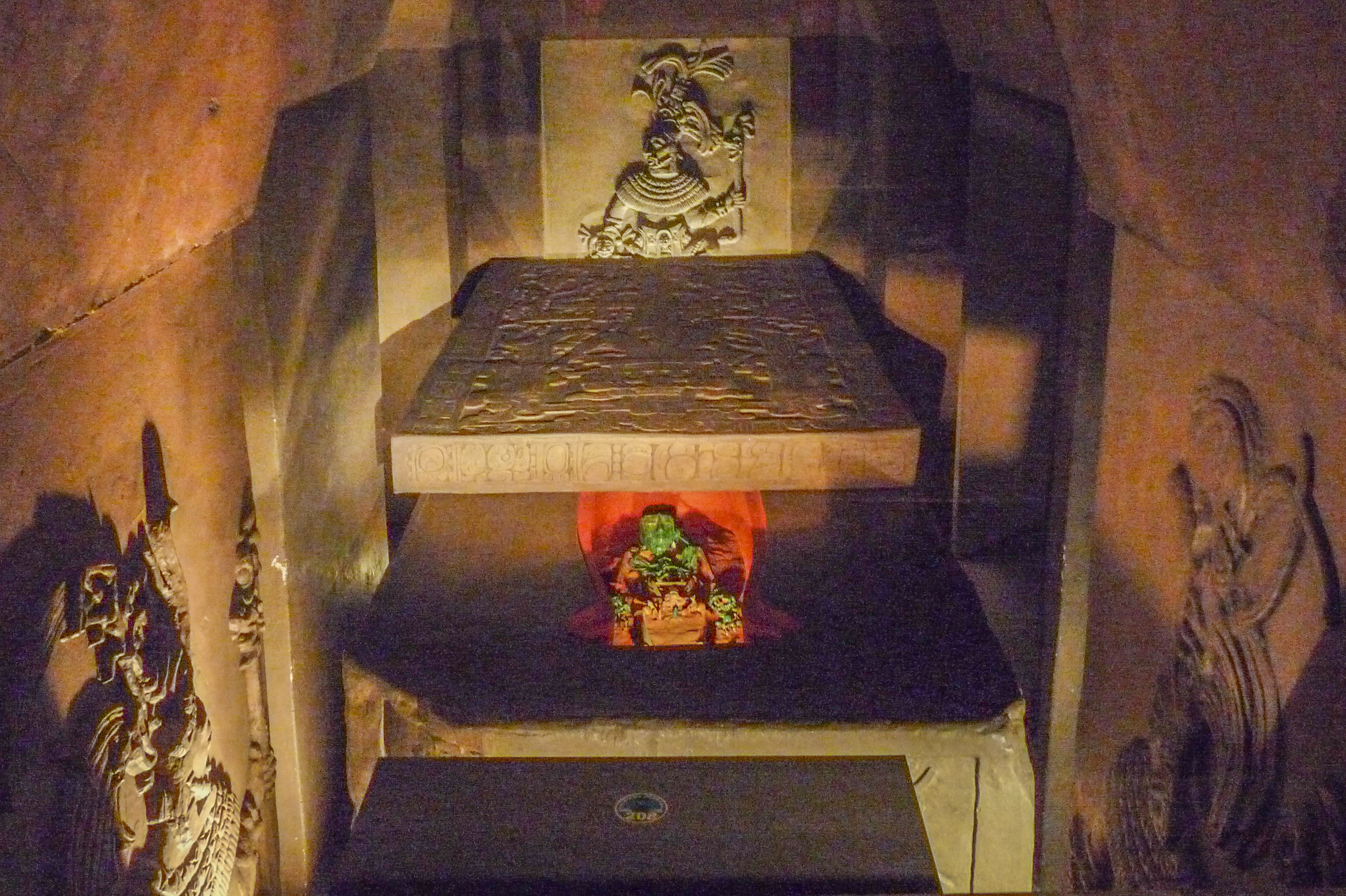
Reproduction of the mausoleum of the Palenque ruler, K'inich Janaab' Pakal

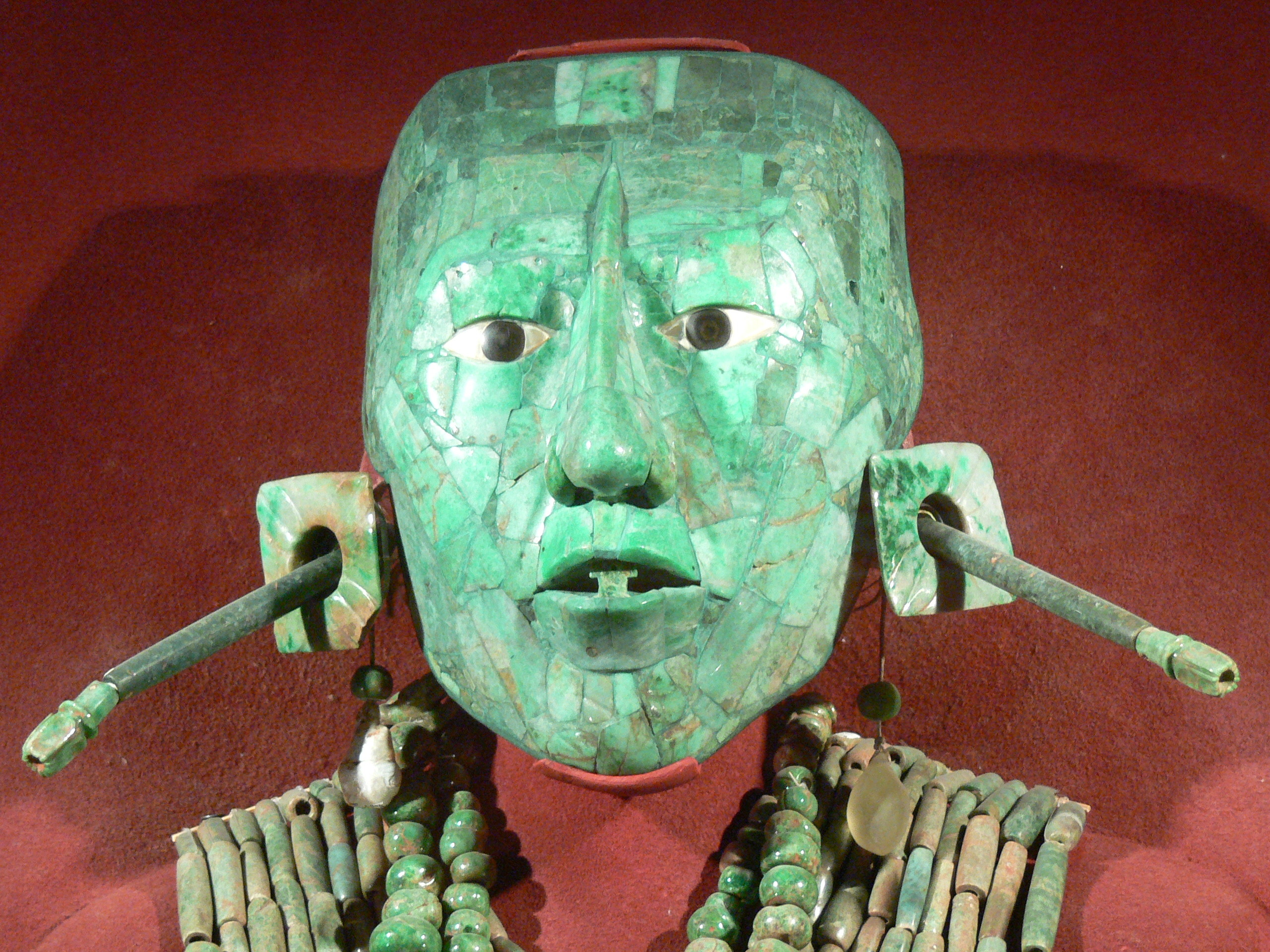
Jade mask of Pakal

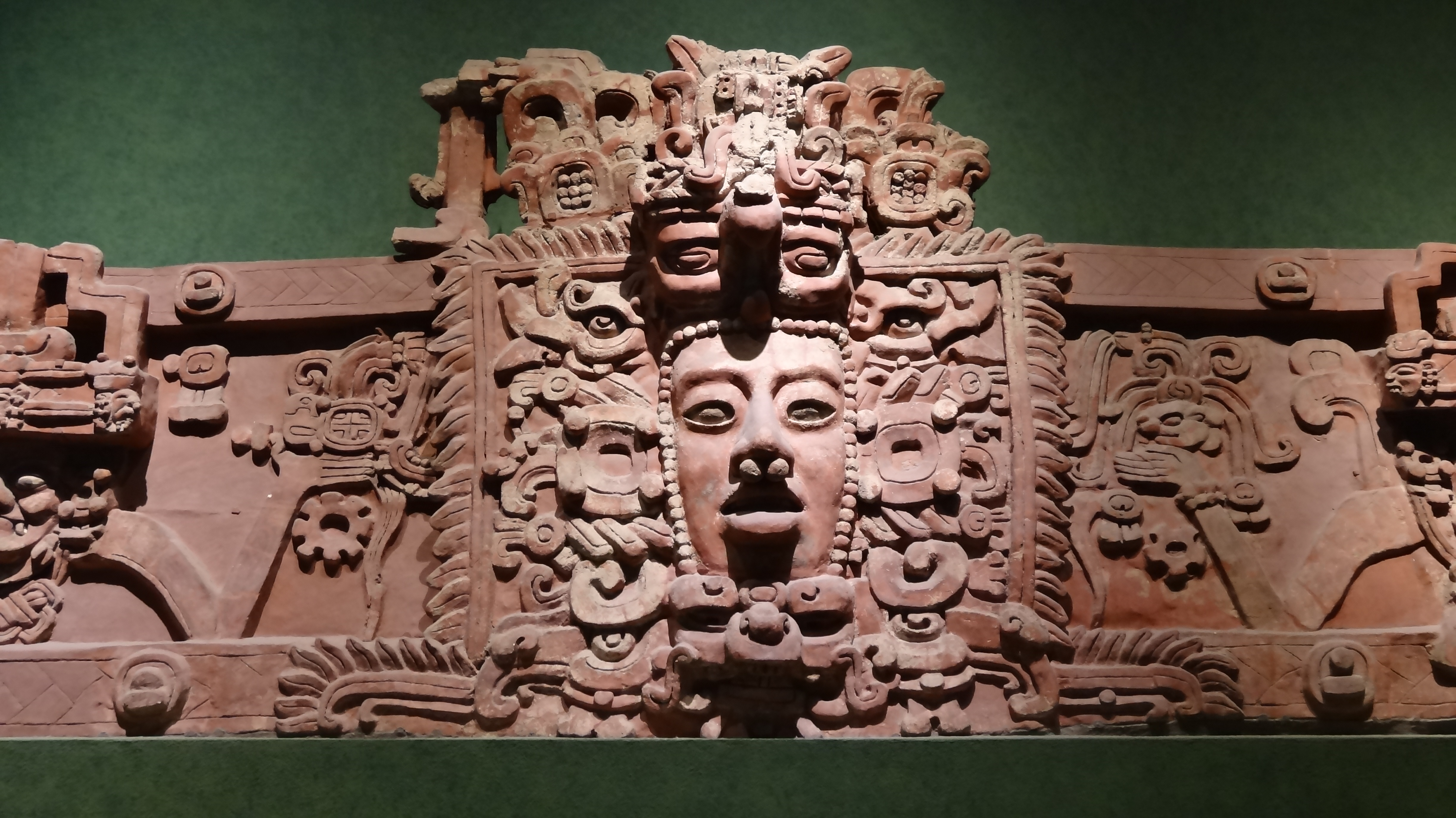
Frieze of Placeres

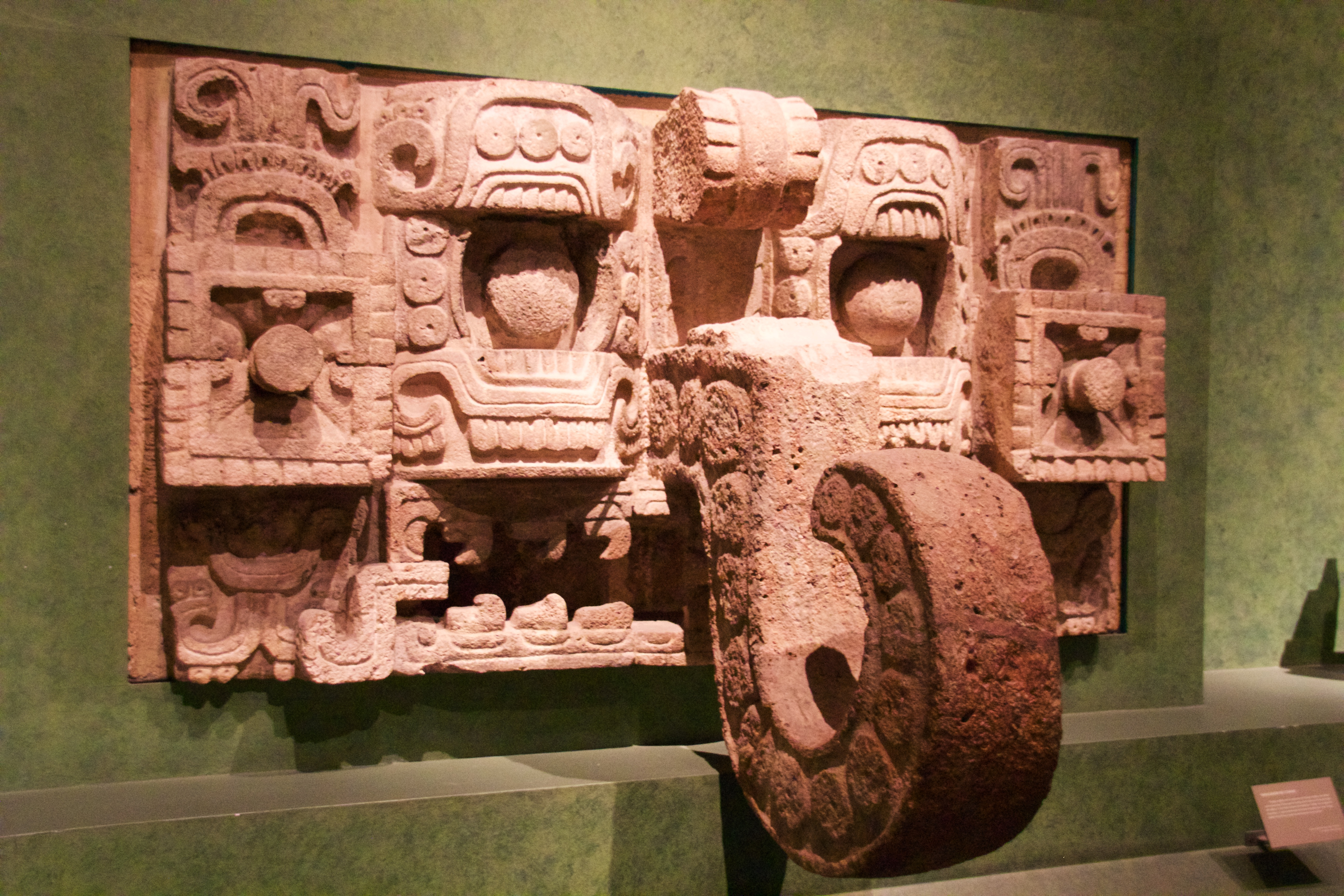
Mask of Chaac

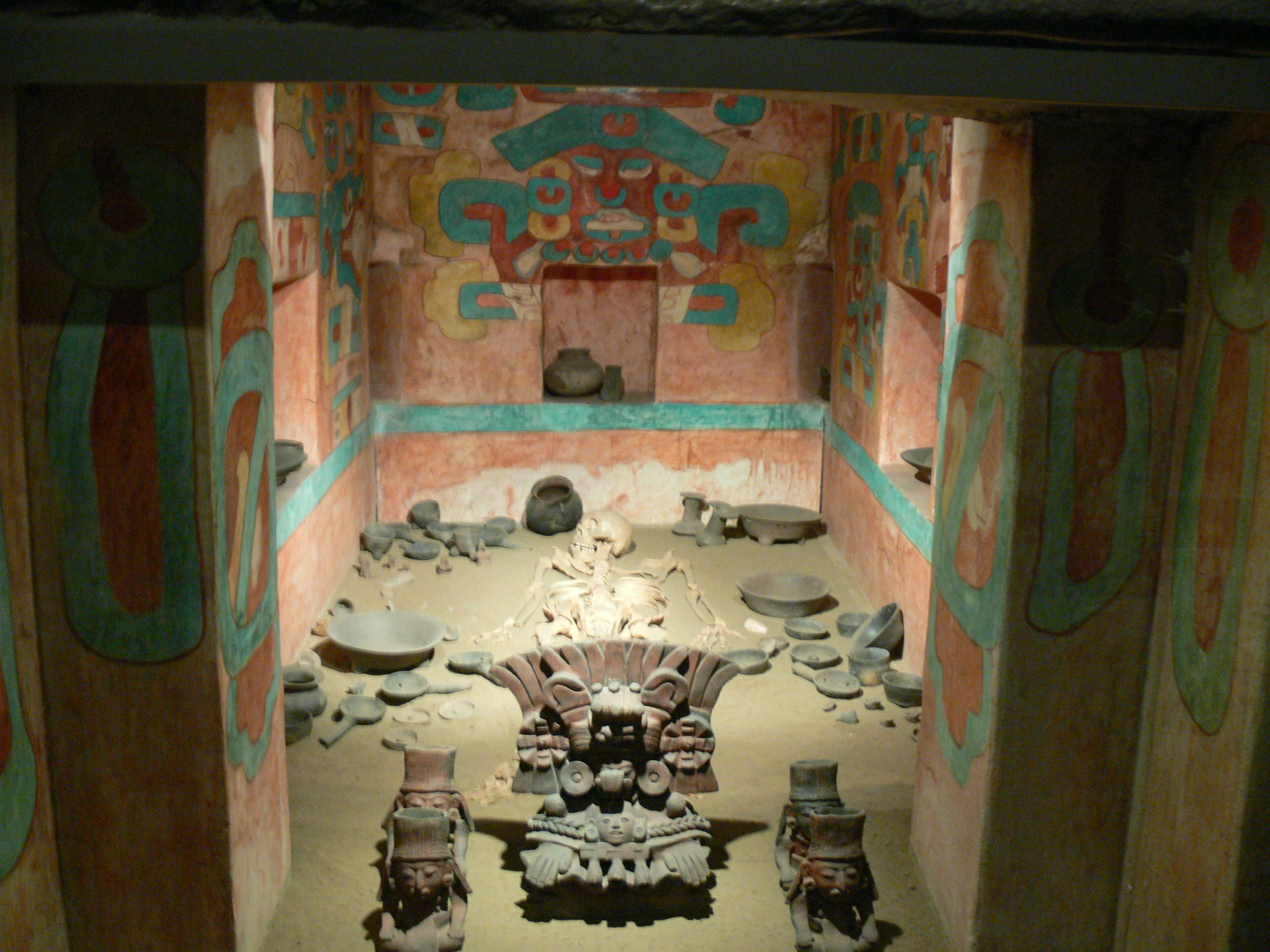
Reproduction of the Tomb 105 of Monte Albán

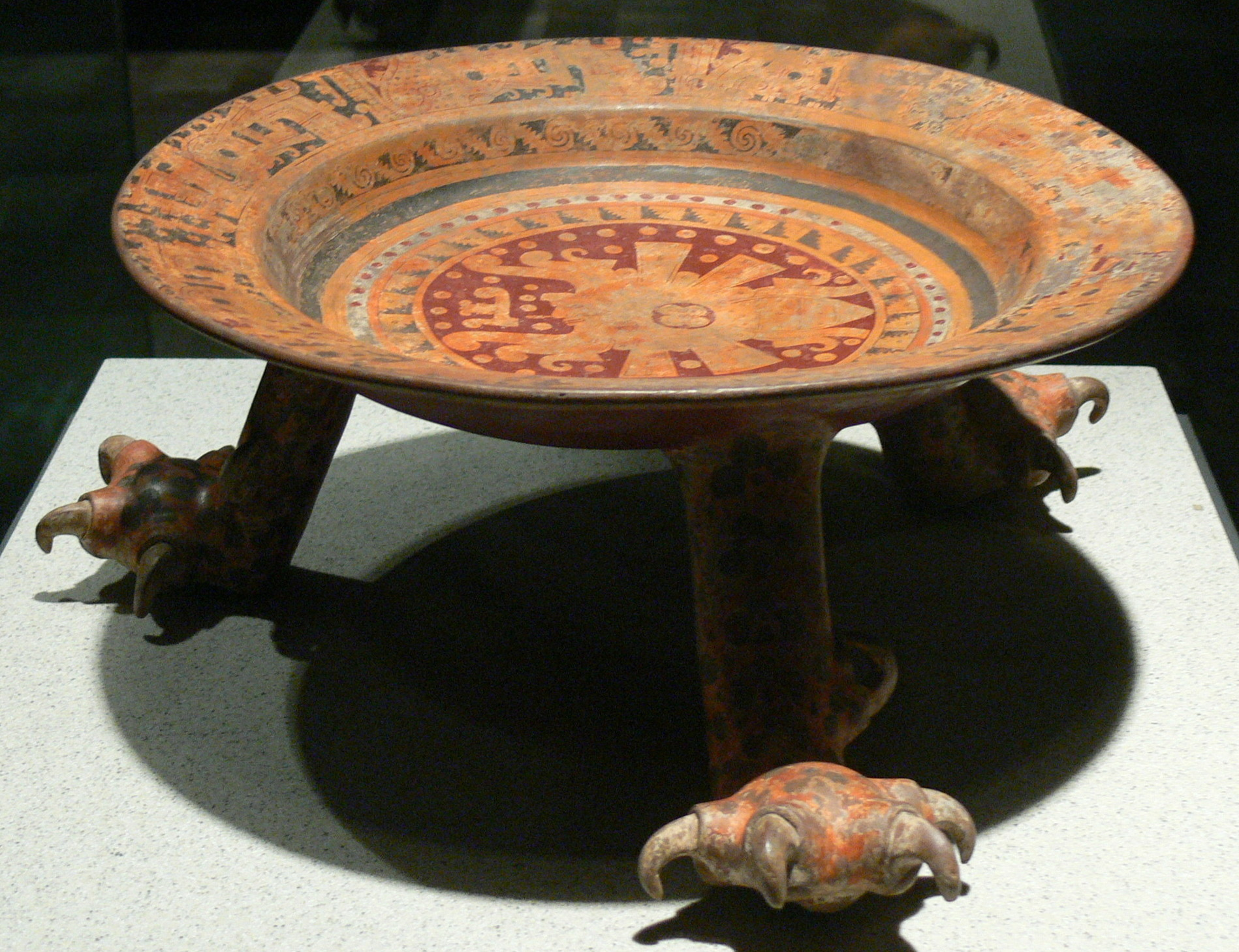
Mixtec ceramic

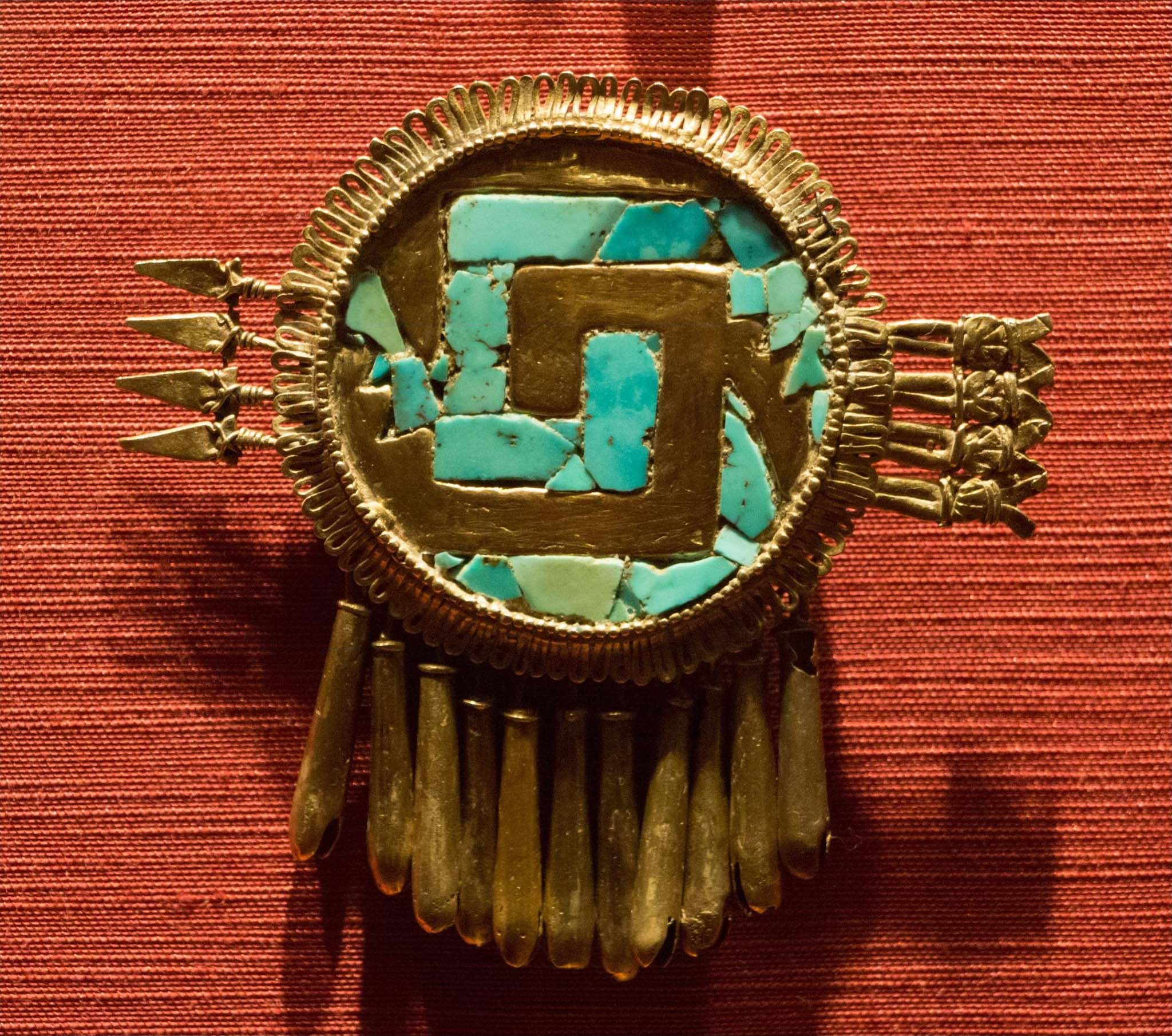
Mixtec pectoral of gold and turquoise, Shield of Yanhuitlán

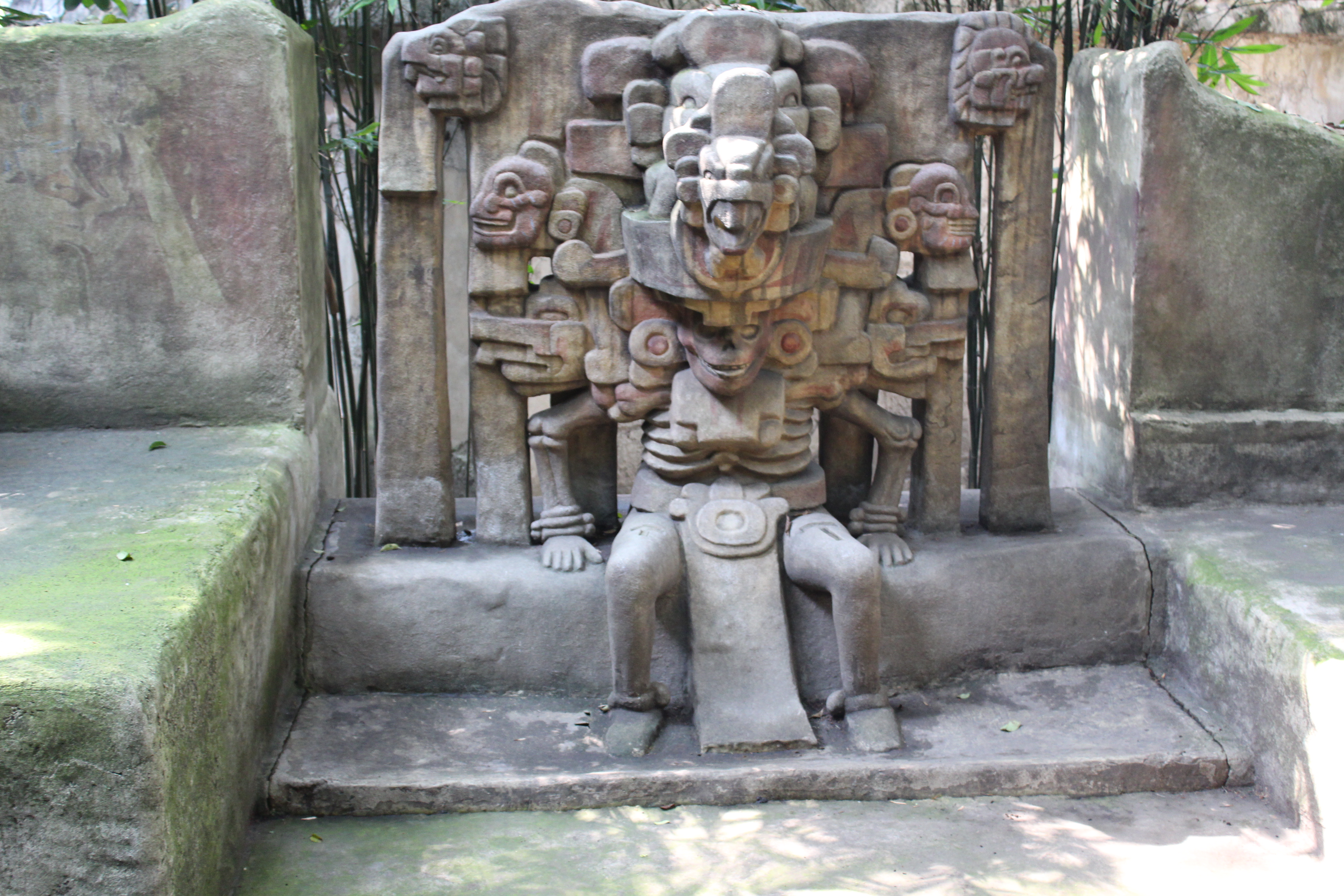
Reproduction of the sculpture of Mictlantecuhtli in El Zapotal

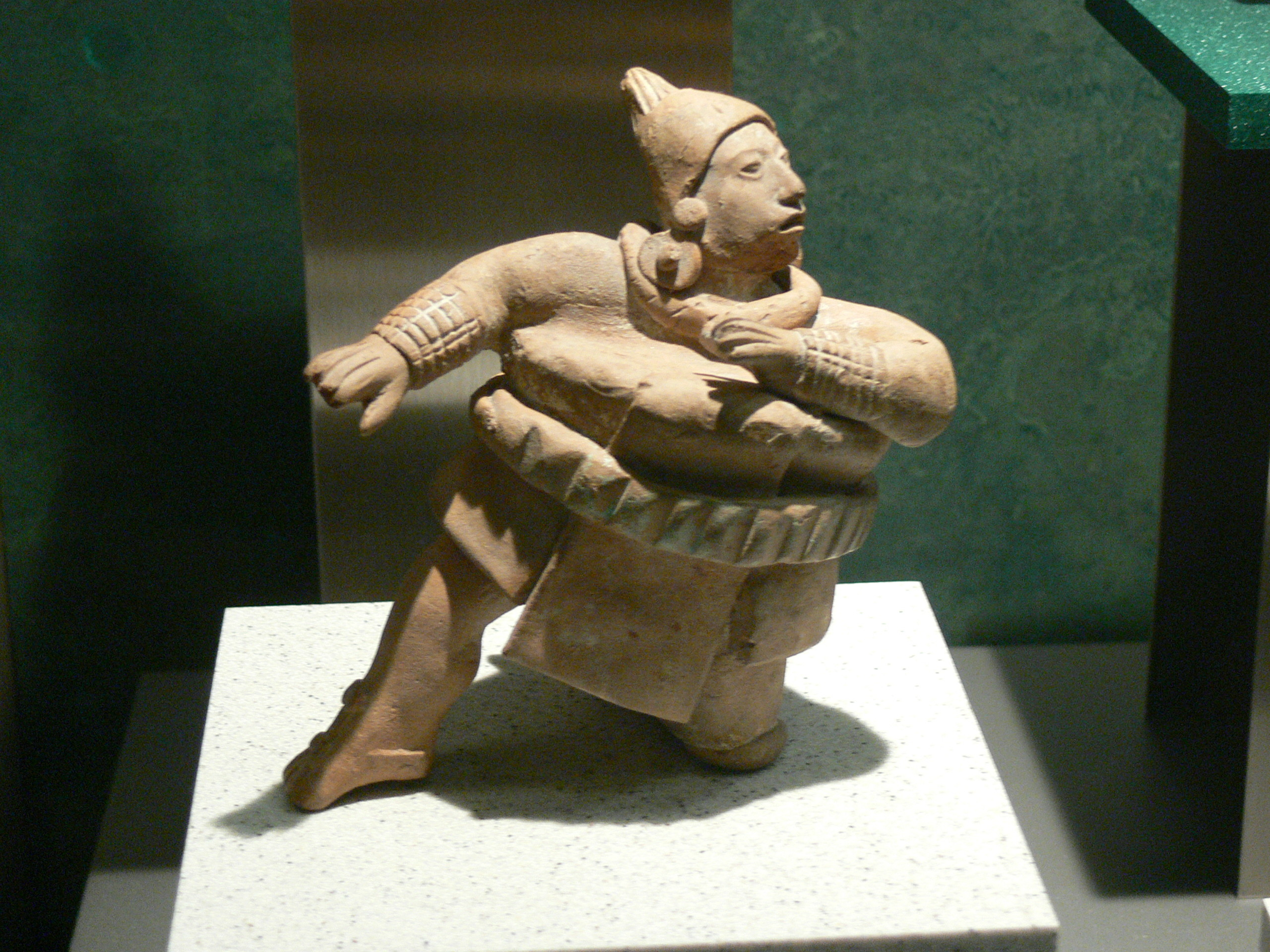
Figure of a pelota player

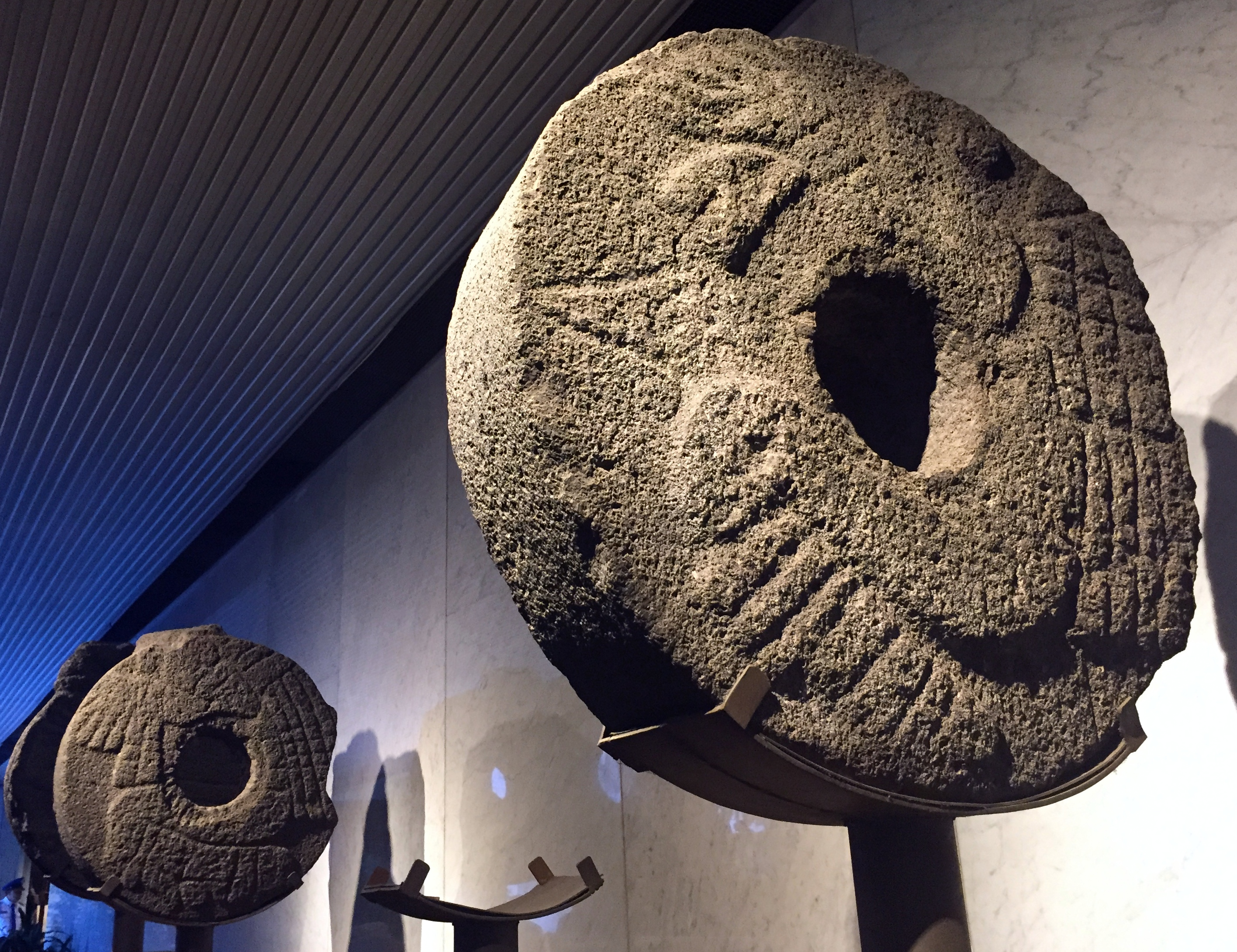
Ball game goal, Chichen Itza
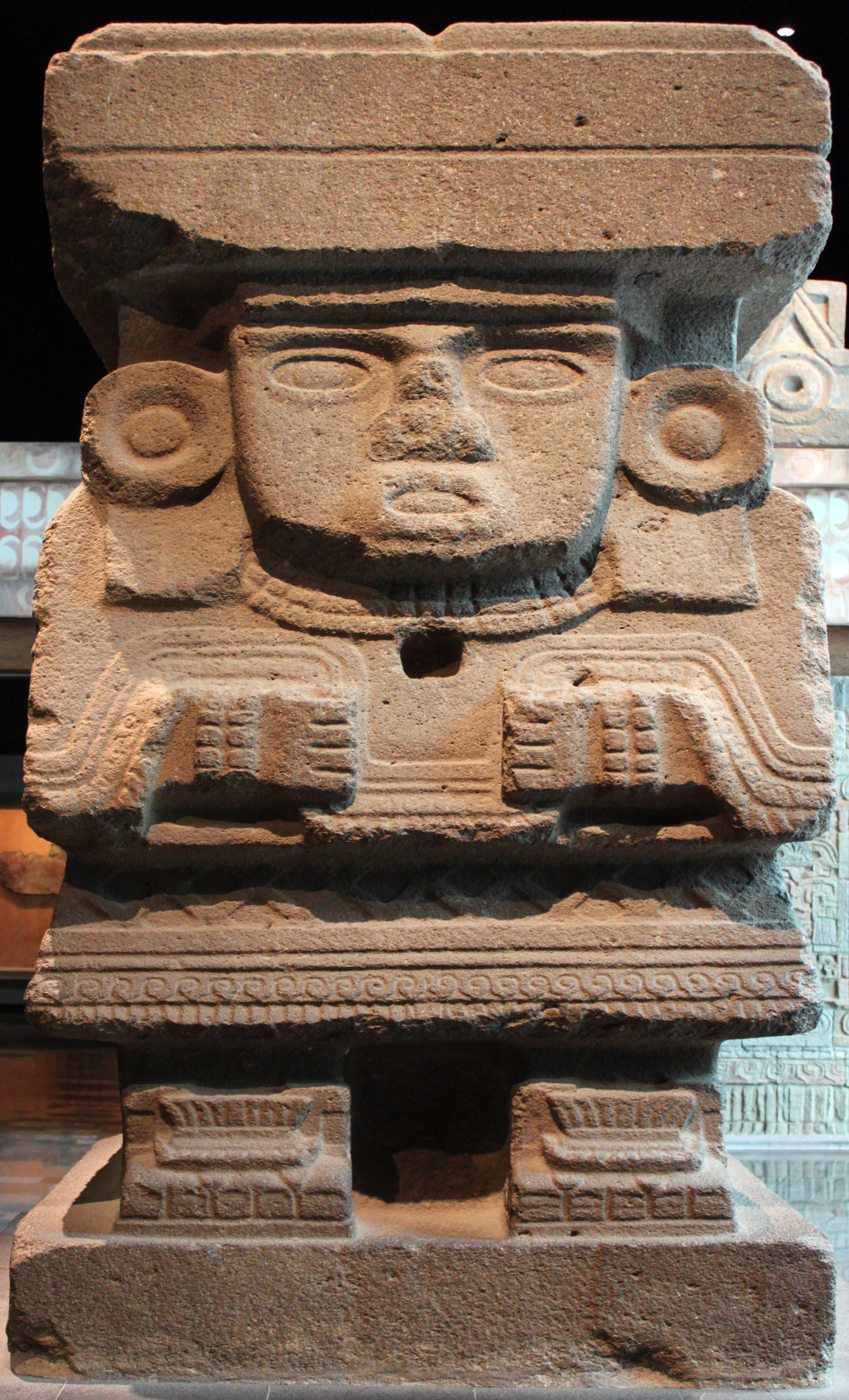
Statue of Chalchiuhtlicue

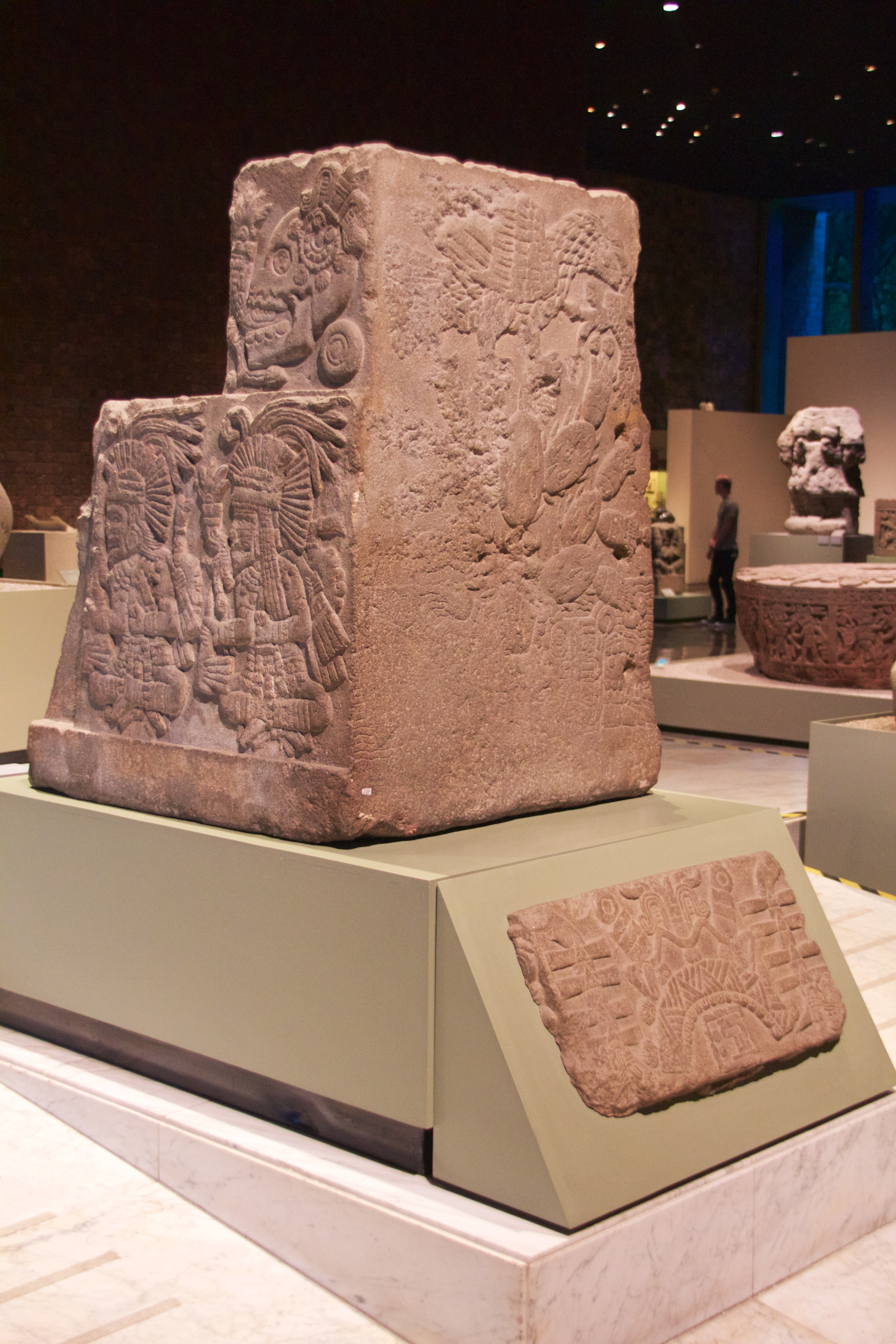
Teocalli of the sacred war

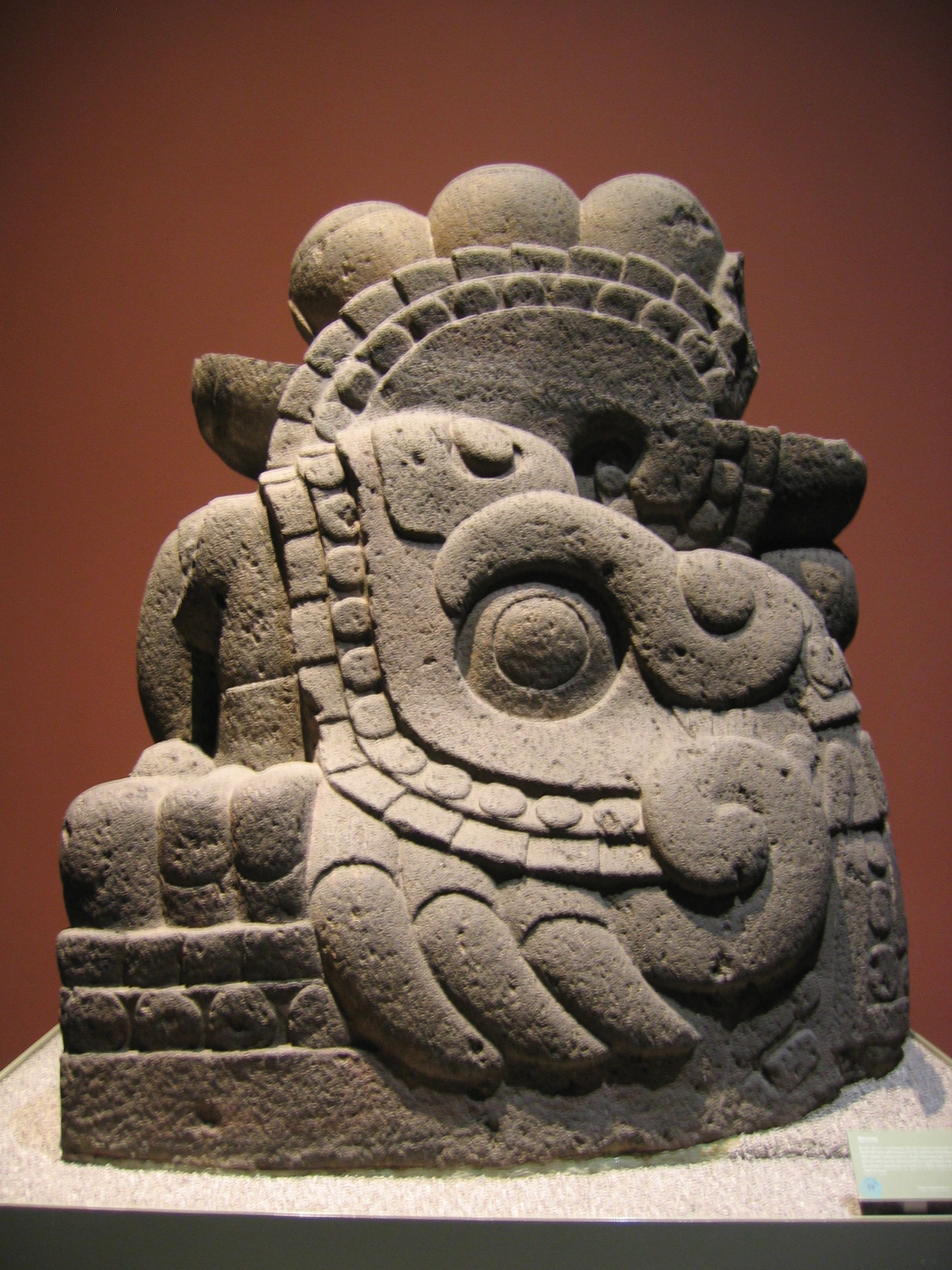
Statue of Xiuhcoatl

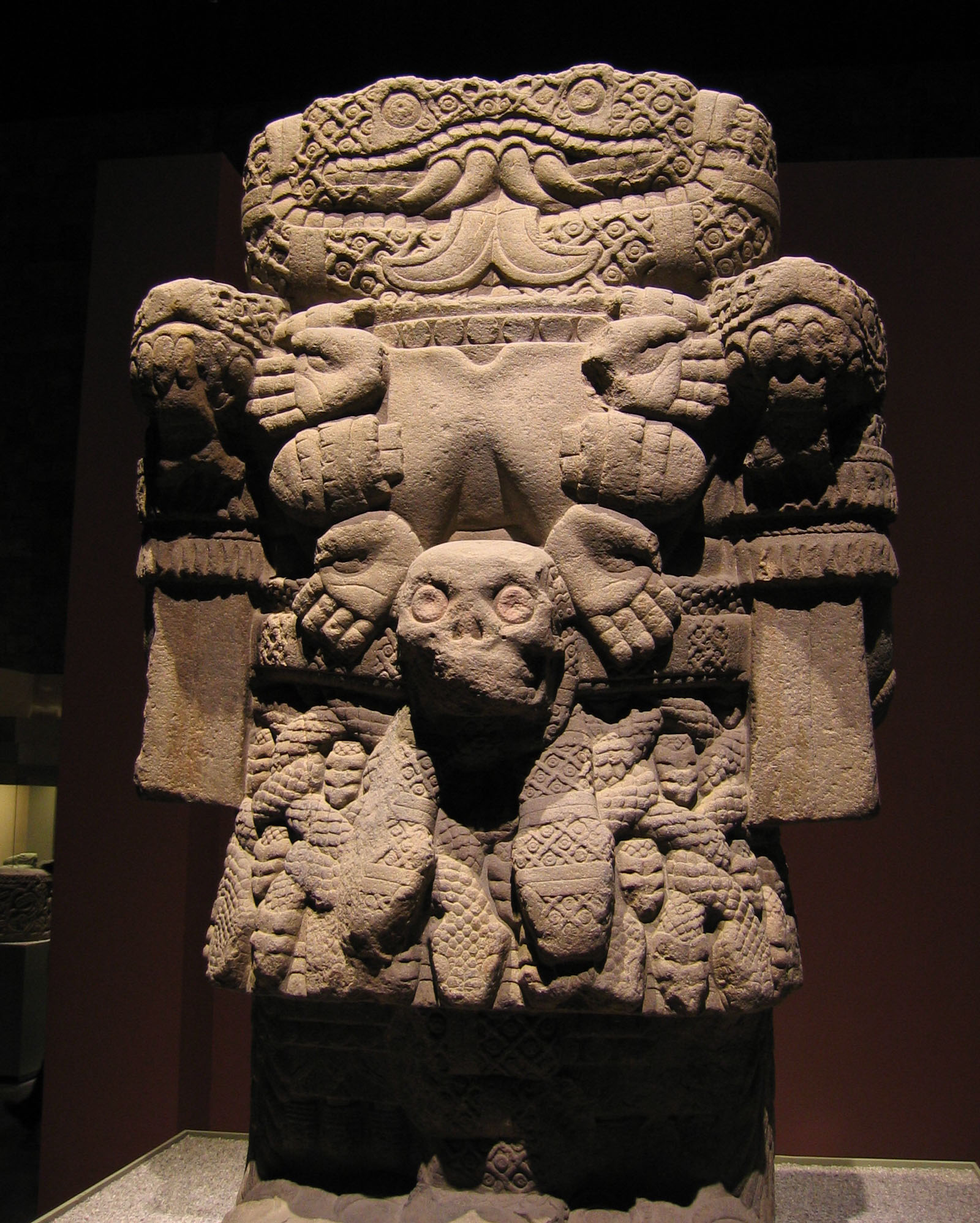
Statue of Aztec goddess Coatlicue

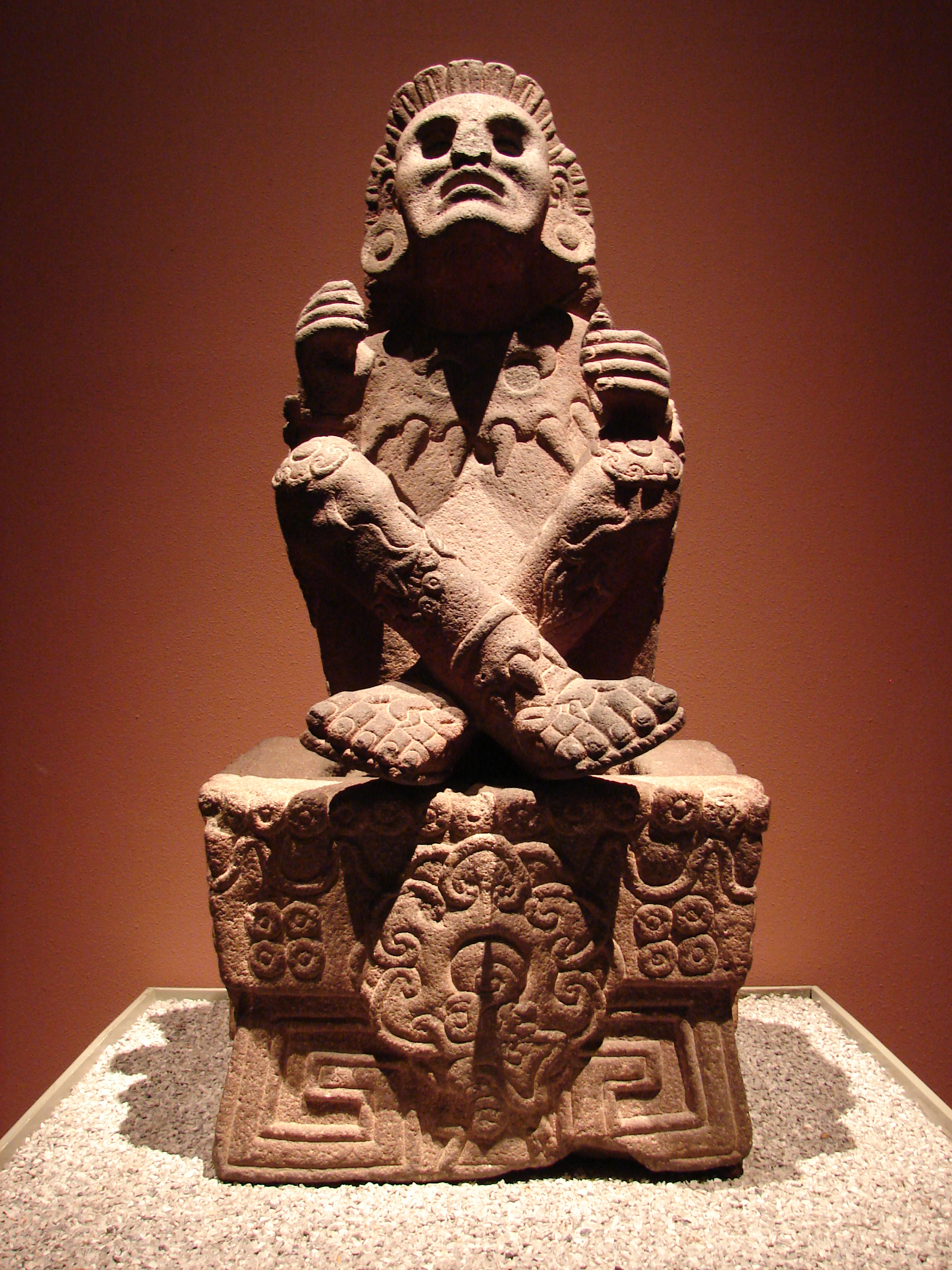
Xochipilli

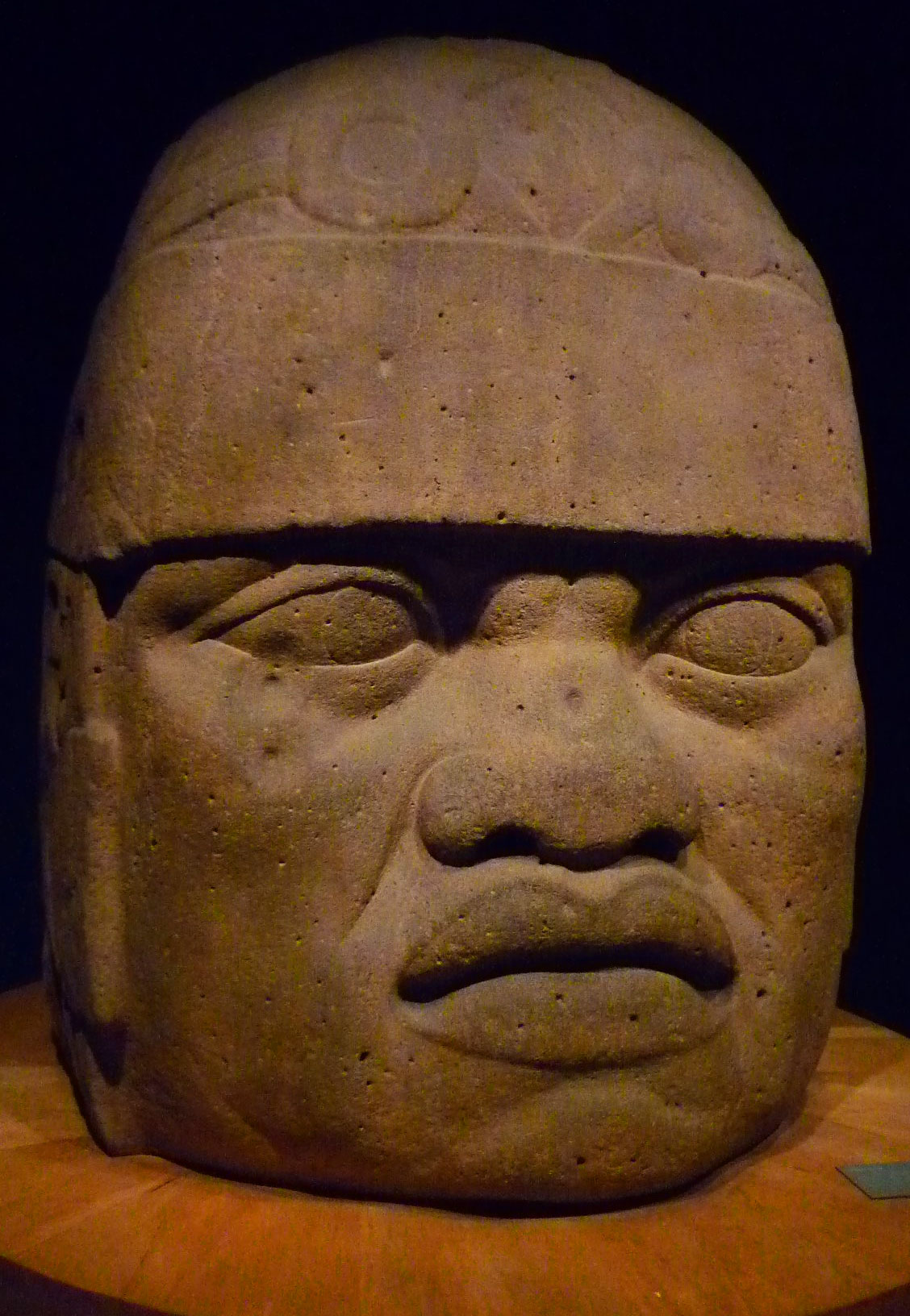
Olmec colossal head

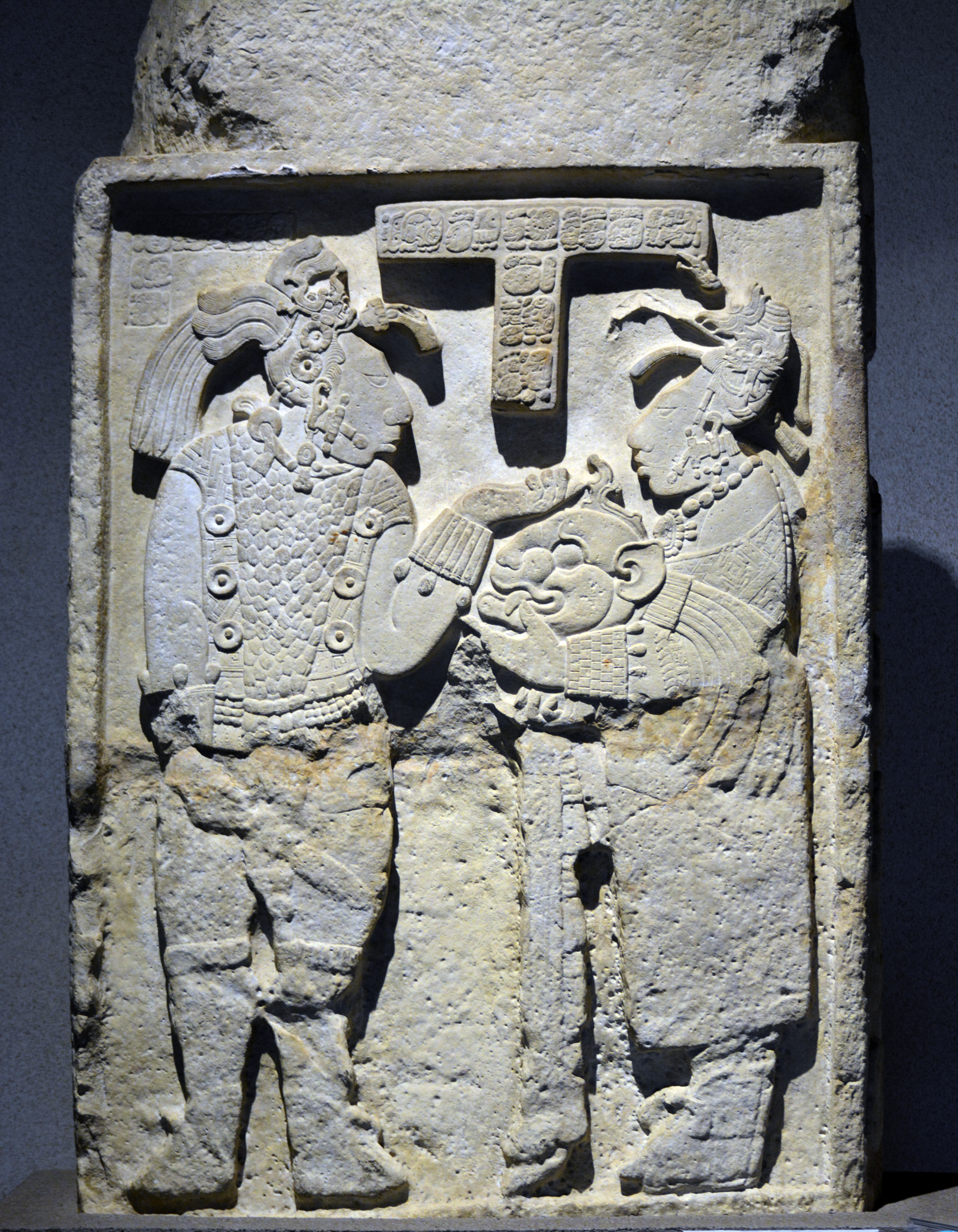
Lintel 26, Yaxchilan

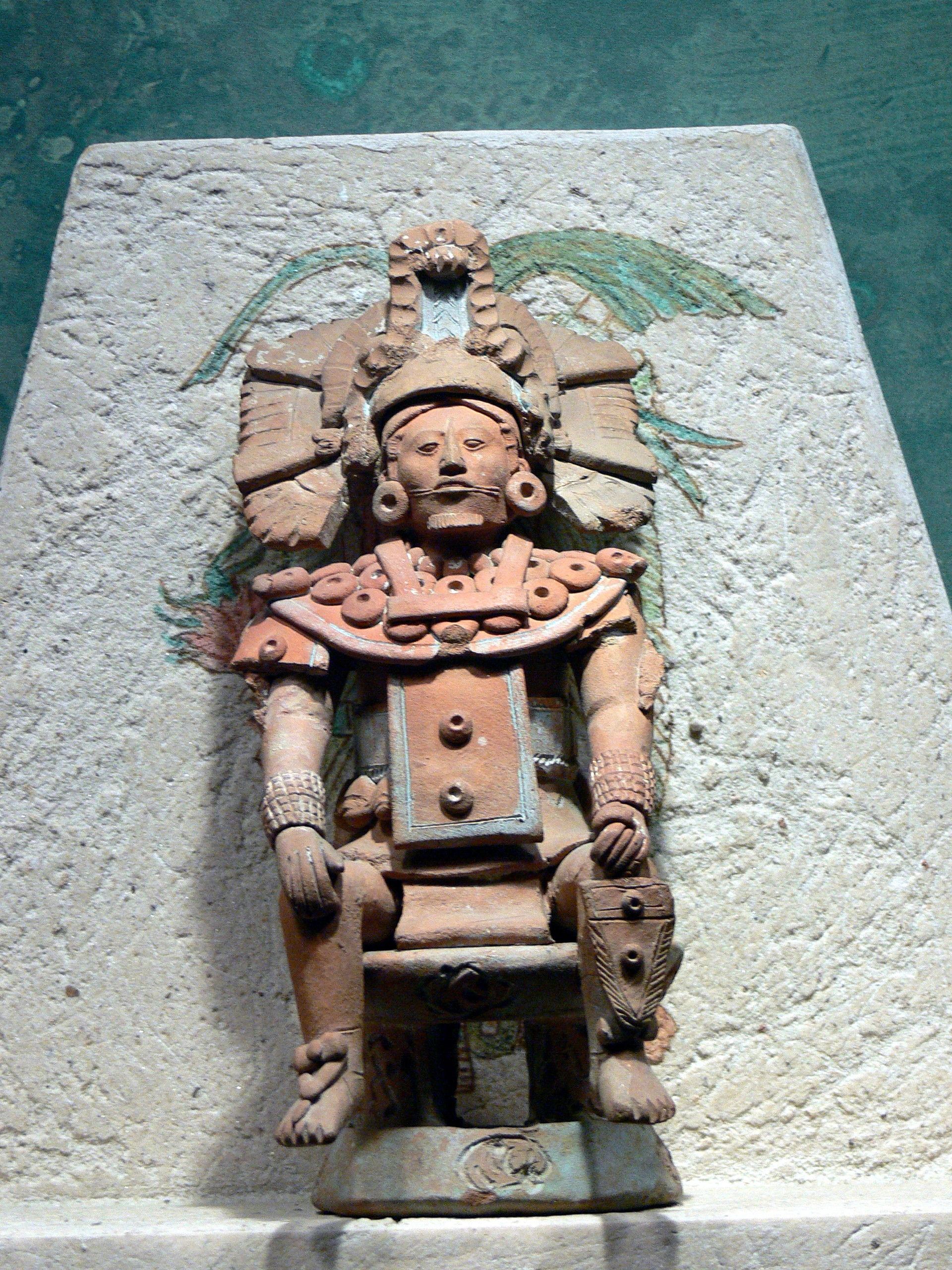
Ceramic of the Jaina Island

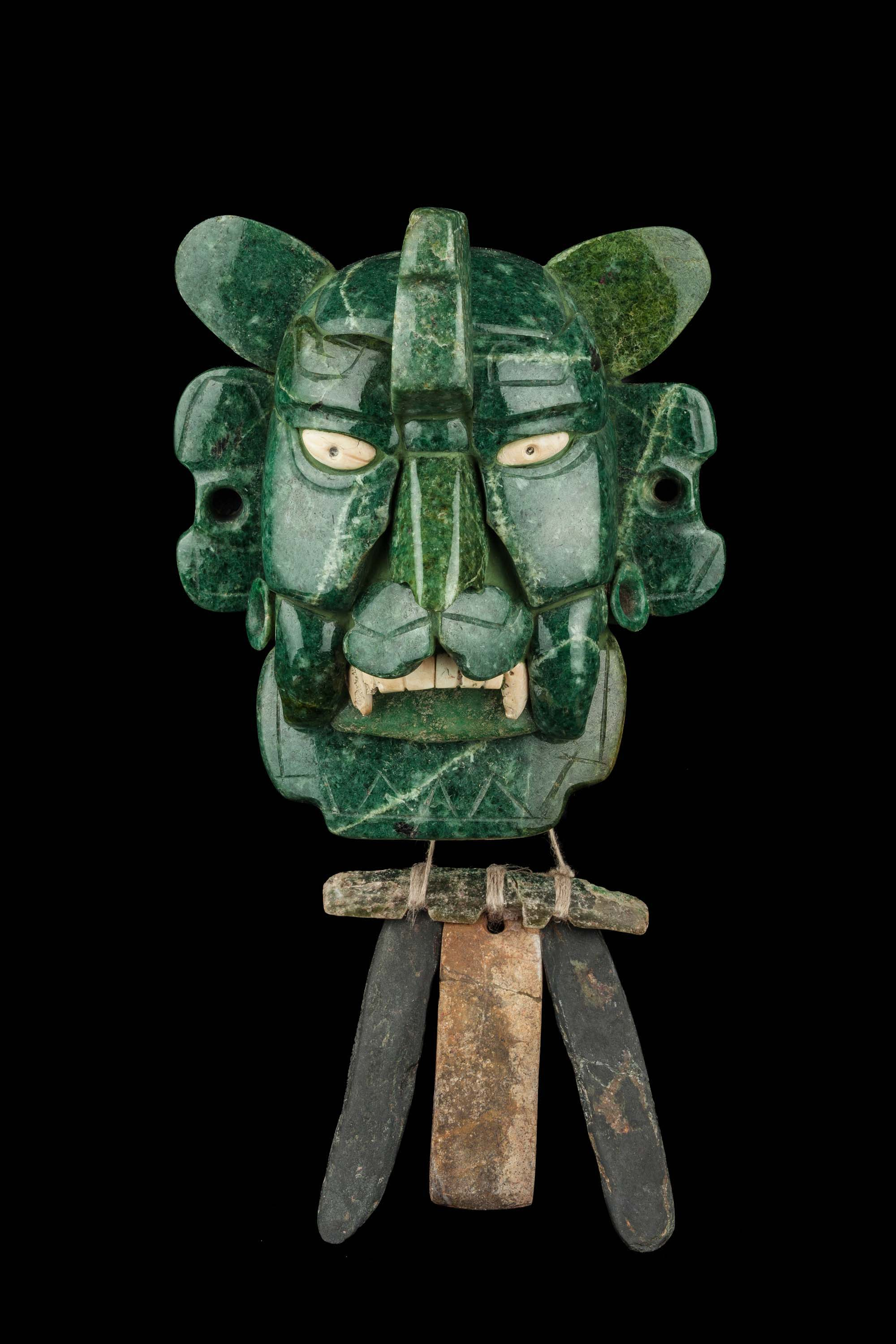
Zapotec mask of the Bat God

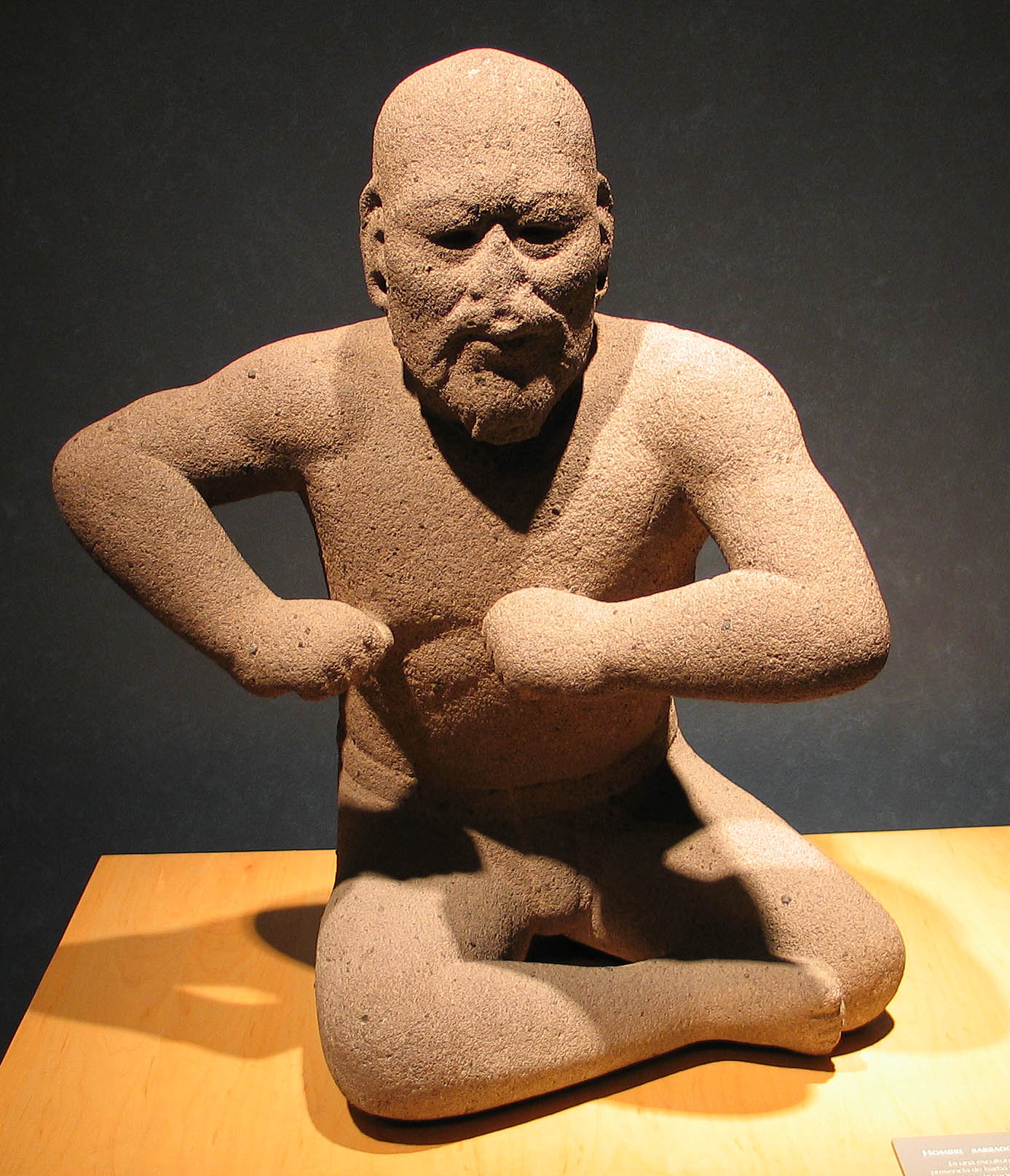
Olmec wrestler

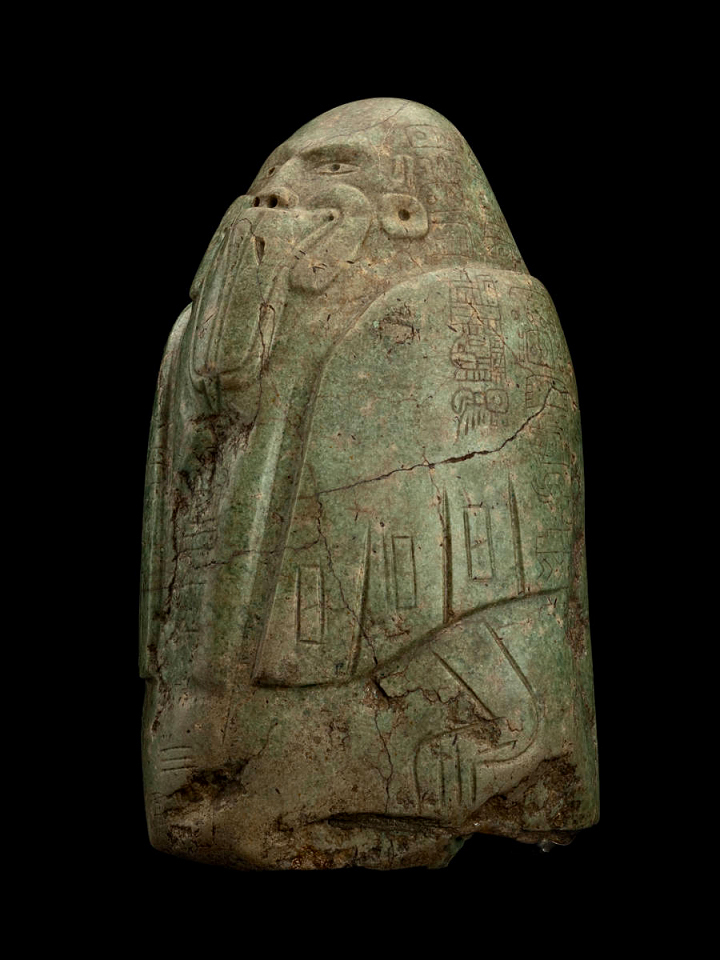
Tuxtla statuette

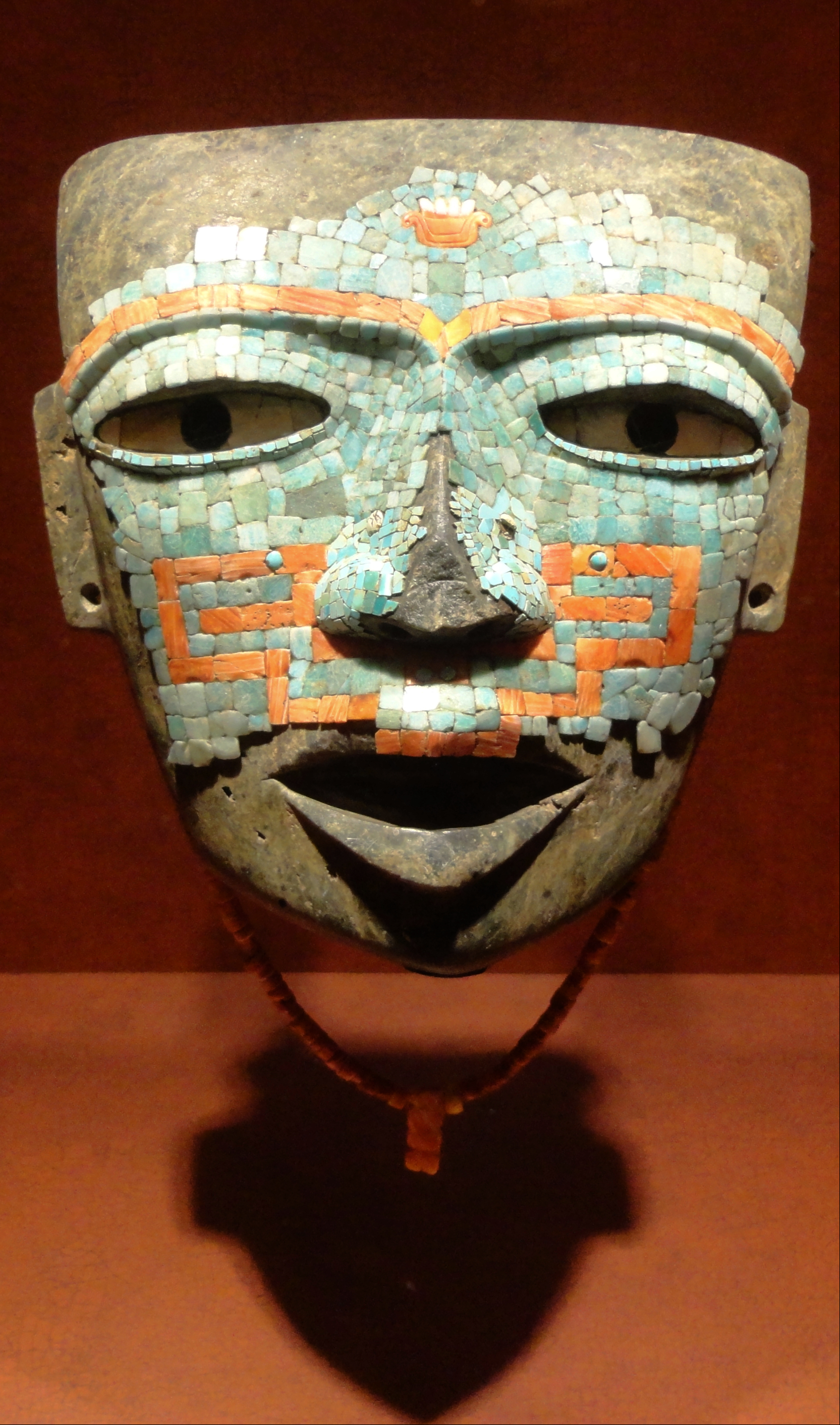
Mask of Malinaltepec

== See also ==
- Doris Heyden
