= Quinametzin =

Aztec legendary being

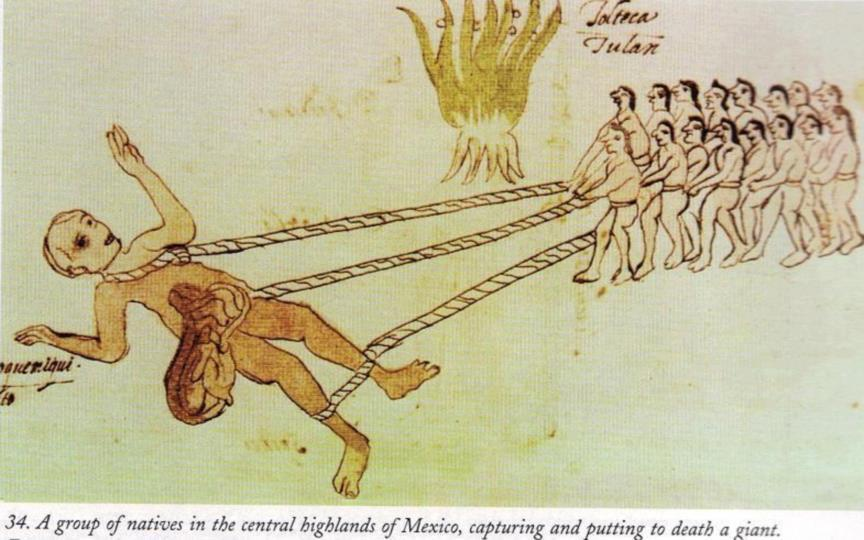
Men dragging a dead giant, Codex Ríos.

In Aztec mythology, the Quinametzin (singular: Quinamehtli/Quinametli) are a race of Aztec giants.

== Mythology ==
The Quinametzin populated the world during the previous era of the Sun of Rain (Nahui-Quiahuitl). The construction of the pyramid of Cholula and the City of Teotihuacan (The Place Where Men Become Gods) was attributed to the Quinametzin. The Quinametzin were punished by the Aztec gods because they did not venerate them and their peak-civilization came to an end as a result of great calamities and as a punishment from the heavens for grave sins they had committed.

== Known Quinametzin ==
- Cuauhtemoc, Izcoalt, Izcaqlli and Tenexuche, the four giants who supported the sky at the beginning of the Fifth Sun.
- The six giant sons of Iztac-Mixcoatl and Tlaltecuhtli:
  - Xelhua, a giant founder of Cuauquechollan, Itzocan, Epatlan, Teopantlan, Tehuacan, Cuzcatlan and Teotitlan, this giant built the great Pyramid of Cholula.
  - Tenoch, a giant founder of Tenochtitlan.
  - Ulmecatl, a giant founder of Cuetlachcoapan, Tontonihuacan, Huitzilapan.
  - Xicalancatl, a giant founder of Xicallancatl.
  - Mixtecatl, a giant founder of Mixteca.
  - Otomitl, a giant founder of Xilotepec, Tollan, Otompan.

== See also ==
- Igigi
- Nephilim
- Silver age
