= Stone of Tizoc =

Aztec artefact

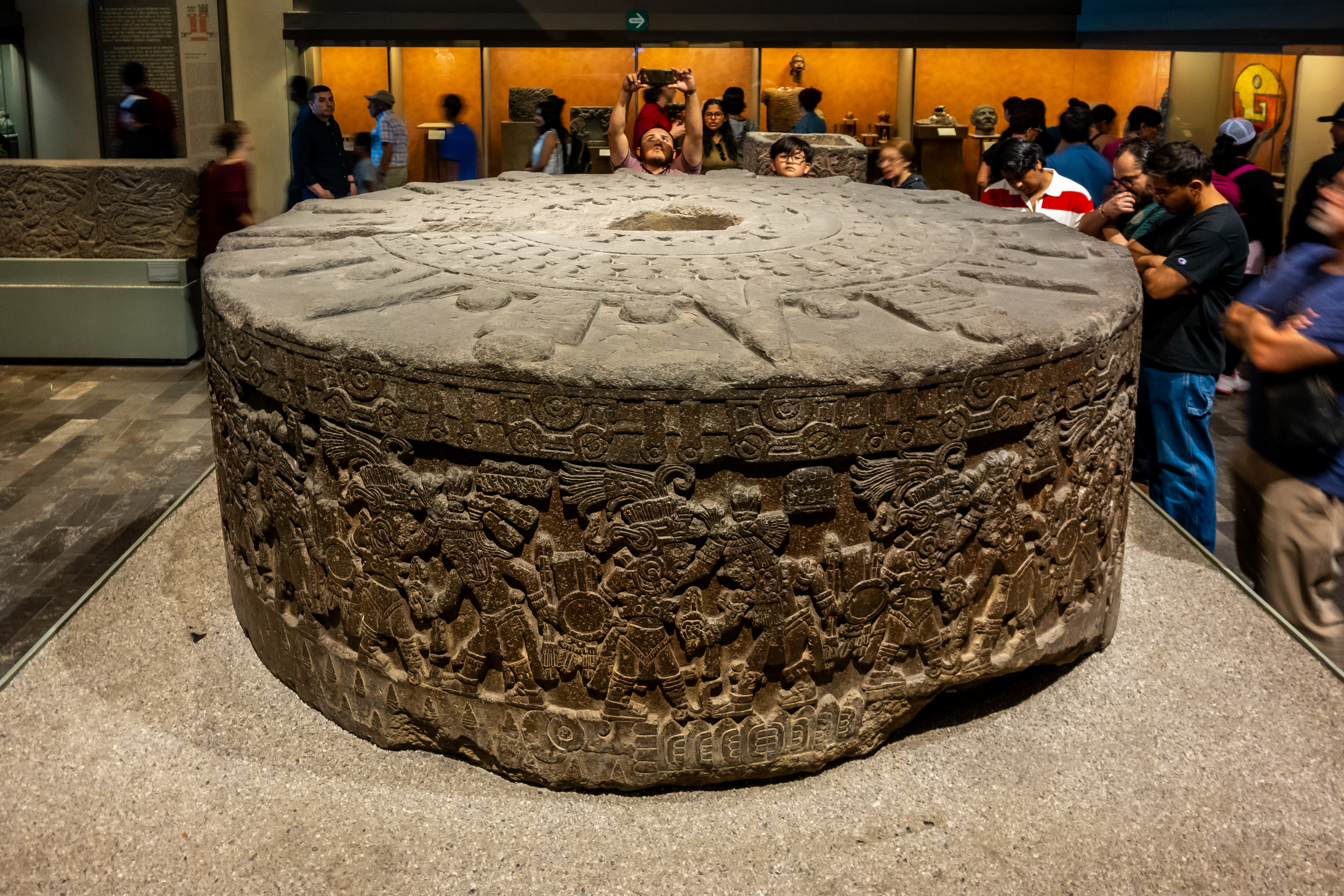
- Material: Basalt
- Created: 1480s
- Discovered: 17 December 1791
- Present location: National Museum of Anthropology, Mexico City

The Stone of Tizoc, Tizoc Stone or Sacrificial Stone is a large, round, carved Aztec stone. Because of a shallow, round depression carved in the center of the top surface, it may have been a cuauhxicalli or possibly a temalacatl. Richard Townsend maintains, however, that the depression was made in the 16th century for unknown purposes.

The stone was rediscovered on 17 December 1791 when the Zócalo, the heart of downtown Mexico City, was being repaved. Workmen had been cutting cobblestone, and were about to cut up the carved monolith. A churchman named Gamboa happened to be passing by and saved the stone from the same result. The stone was then moved to the nearby Cathedral, and propped up vertically on one of the building's towers, where it stayed until 1824, when it was moved to the university. The stone is currently in the National Museum of Anthropology in Mexico City.

The monolith is made of basalt and measures 93 cm tall with a diameter of 2.65 meters and a circumference of 8.31 meters.

== Features ==
The Stone of Tizoc

The lateral side of the stone depicts 15 separate scenes of a repeated scene of a costumed warrior having their hair grabbed by another warrior. Presumably the first figure, the warrior with the largest headdress is identified by the glyph of Tizoc and wears the headdress of the deity Huitzilopotchli, the revered god of war.

In each scene the warrior being grabbed has an identifying location glyph. Each of the warriors grabbing the other are identified with the 'smoking foot' motif as well as the symbol of the smoking mirror in their headdress both icons associating them with the deity Tezcatlipoca.

Along the bottom of the rim are glyphs representing Tlaltecuhtli at each of the cardinal points, in between these glyphs are rows of tecpatl, sacrificial knives. Along the top of the rim are eyes and circular pieces of jade, symbols of Venus and the stars.

The top of the stone has a sun diadem, with large triangles corresponding with the cardinal directions while smaller rays point in the inter-cardinal directions.

The stone also features a large divot from the center to the edge of the sculpture. This divot is believed to have been done after the creation of the stone due to the rough and asymmetrical nature of the cut.

== Interpretations ==
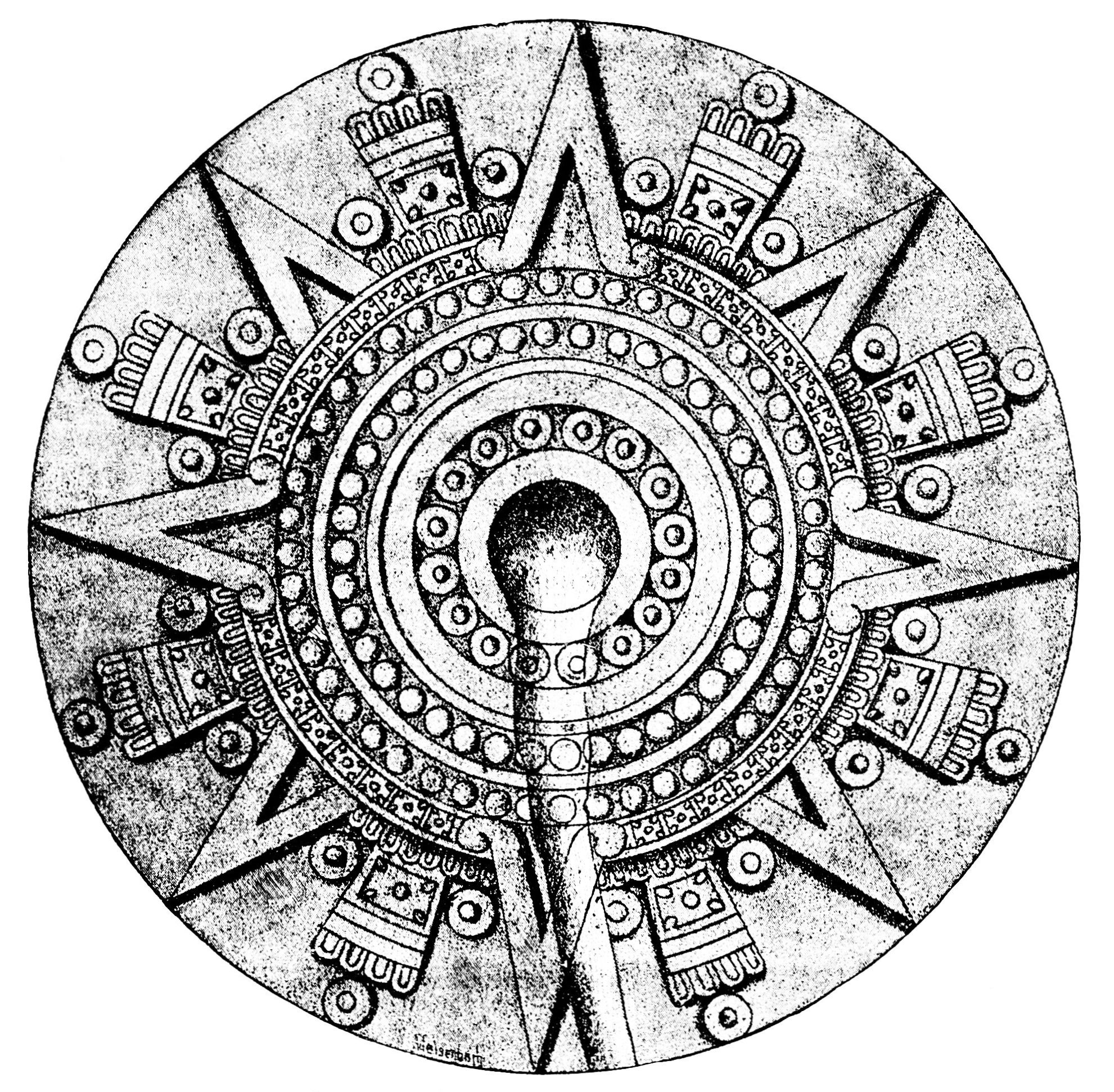
Top View of The Stone of Tizoc

The act of grabbing another's hair has long been recognized as a symbol of defeat or conquering in Mesoamerica, as such the stone is interpreted to represent the conquest of other locations by the Mexica. The main interpretation is that the stone is a propaganda piece for Tizoc, the Aztec Emperor from 1481 to 1486; an average emperor who wanted, and helped to, rebuild the Aztec pyramid.

Aztec glyphs above each conquered soldier give the name of the original site which may have already been conquered. The toponyms are written in a mixture of logographic and syllabic signs. The stone also depicts the stars at the top rim, emphasizing the heavens; while the icons at the bottom edge represent the earth. Combined with the solar iconography on the top, this associates Aztec conquering and rule with the divine.

While Tizoc is the only identifiable conqueror, each subsequent Mexica warrior shares the same 'smoking foot' motif to link them together. Some historians take this to mean that Tizoc is attempting to link his only large military conquest, depicted as the first scene, to the conquests of previous rulers. The fact that there are fifteen scenes could be related to the 15 lords of the 15 Mexica city-states, emphasizing the political and military divisions of the Mexica emperor.

Richard Townsend argues that the relief may function as a symbolic manifestation of the Aztec empires tribute system. In relation to Mexica tradition, conquered tribes or cities were expected to send sacrificial offerings to the victor. Tizoc, head of the Aztec empire at the time, would therefore be the one collecting these tributes. The stone acts as acknowledgement of such a transaction.

As a temalacatl, the stone may have been used for mock battles between a group of warriors and a victim who was tied to the stone and given a feathery club while the warriors had sharp macuahuitl. It is argued however, that temalactal are often described of as being flat on the top and the central hole lacks any kind of bar with which to tie a victim. More likely however, the stone was used as a cuauhxicalli, within the center of which the hearts of sacrificial victims were placed. It is argued that central hole likely had a face (like the Calendar Stone) which was later mutilated.

== Lateral view of the stone ==
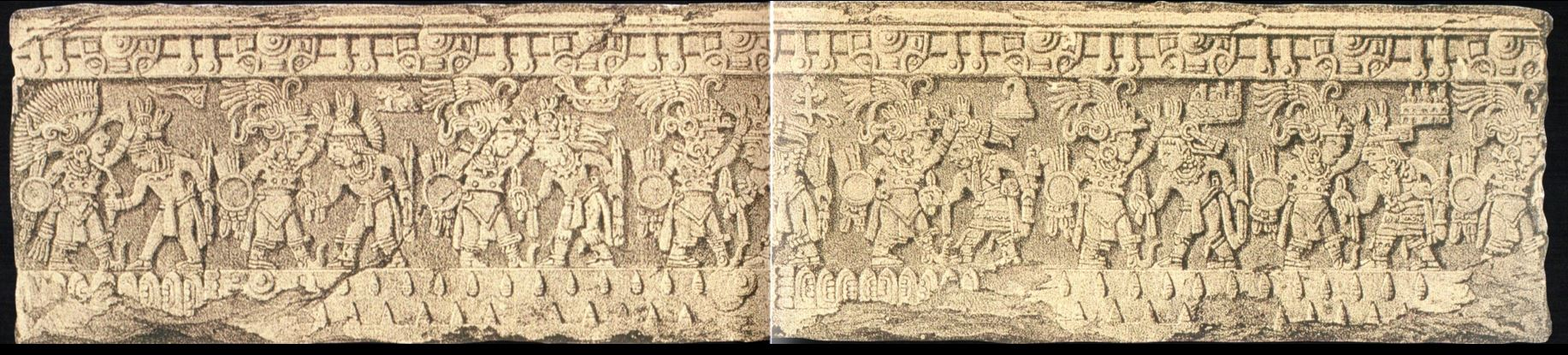

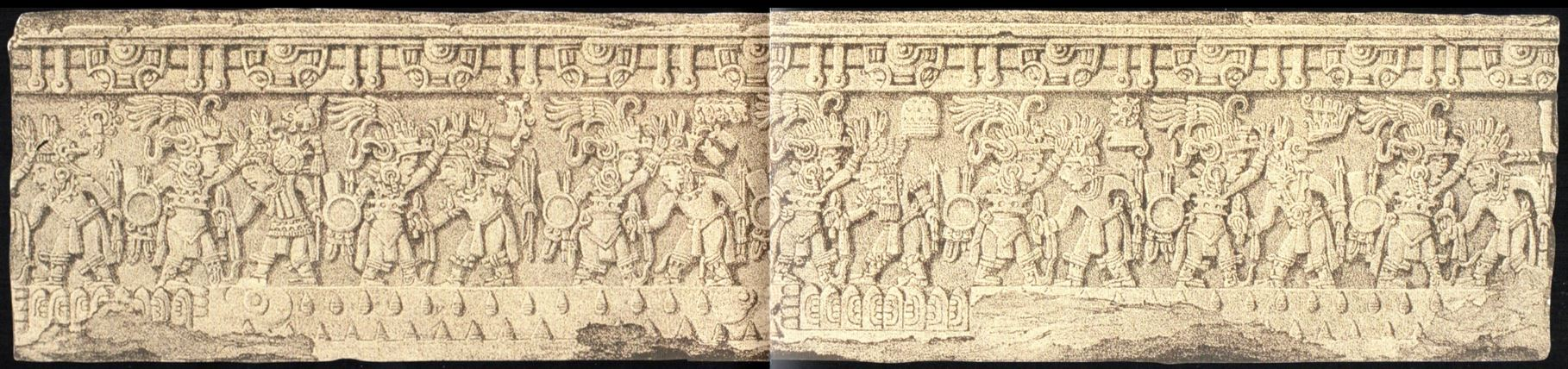

== See also ==
- Aztec sun stone
- Coyolxauhqui stone disk
- Stone of Motecuhzoma I
