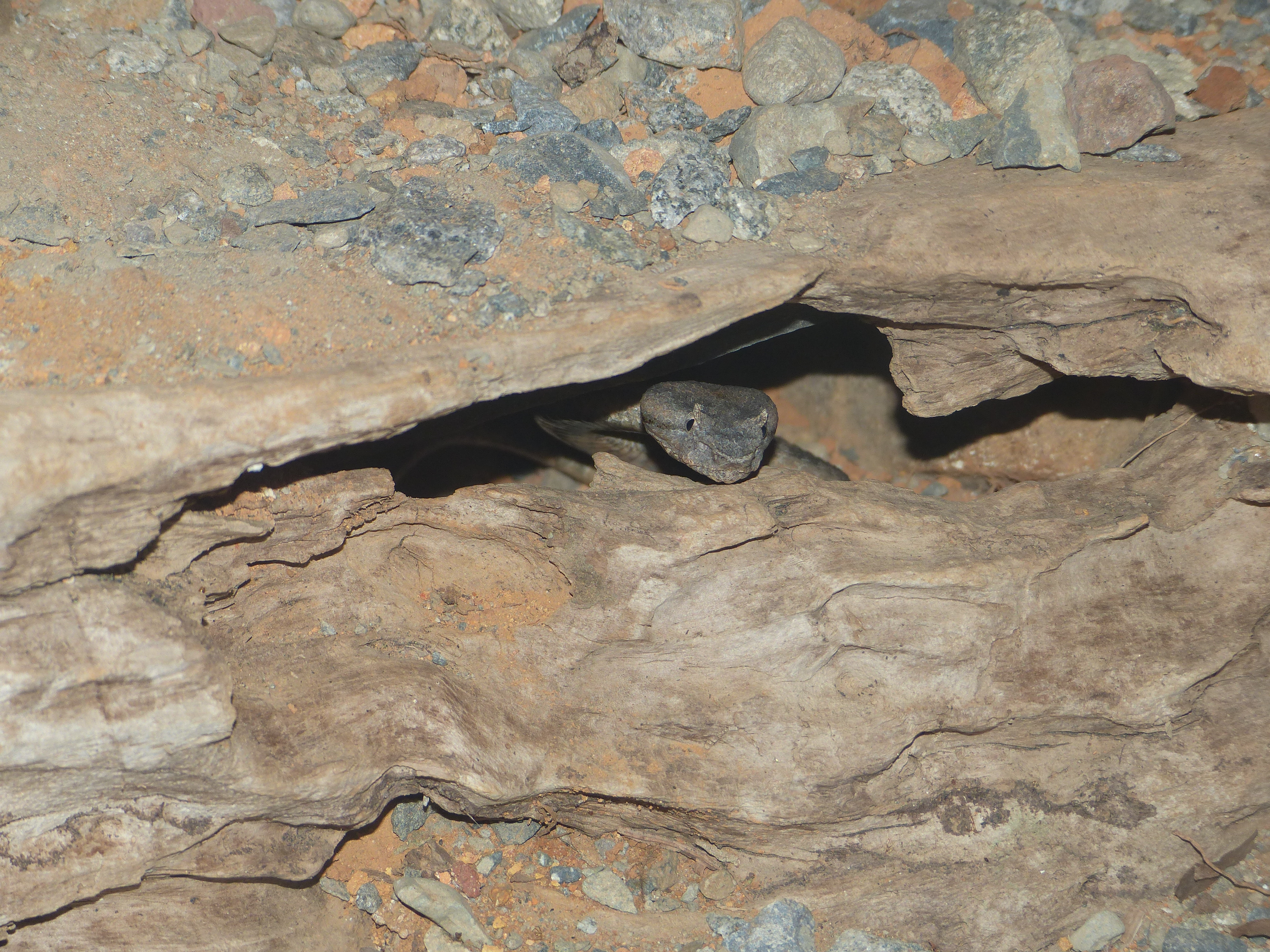
- Mixcoatlus melanurus

Scientific classification
- Kingdom: Animalia
- Phylum: Chordata
- Class: Reptilia
- Order: Squamata
- Suborder: Serpentes
- Family: Viperidae
- Subfamily: Crotalinae
- Genus: Mixcoatlus; Jadin, Smith, and Campbell, 2011

Type species
- Agkistrodon browni Shreve, 1938

Diversity
- 3 species (see text)

= Mixcoatlus =

Genus of snakes

Mixcoatlus is a small genus of pit vipers endemic to Mexico. The genus was described in 2011.

The name Mixcoatlus is derived from the Nahuatl word Mixcoatl or "cloud serpent", a deity of the Aztec and several other Mesoamerican civilizations. This name also refers to the geographic restriction of this clade to elevations above 2,000 meters.

== Species ==
There are three species:

- Mixcoatlus barbouri (Dunn, 1919)
- Mixcoatlus browni (Shreve, 1938)
- Mixcoatlus melanurus (Müller, 1923)
