= Camaxtle (disambiguation) =

The name of Camaxtle is a Mesoamerican deity that is related to other deities and can refer to:

- Mixcoatl from nahuatl mixcoatl 'cloud of snakes' and mixtli, cloud; coatl, snake
- Xipetotec from nahuatl xipetotec 'our lord flayed' and xipe, flayed; to, our; tec-, lord
