= Stone of Motecuhzoma I =

Pre-Columbian Stone Monolith

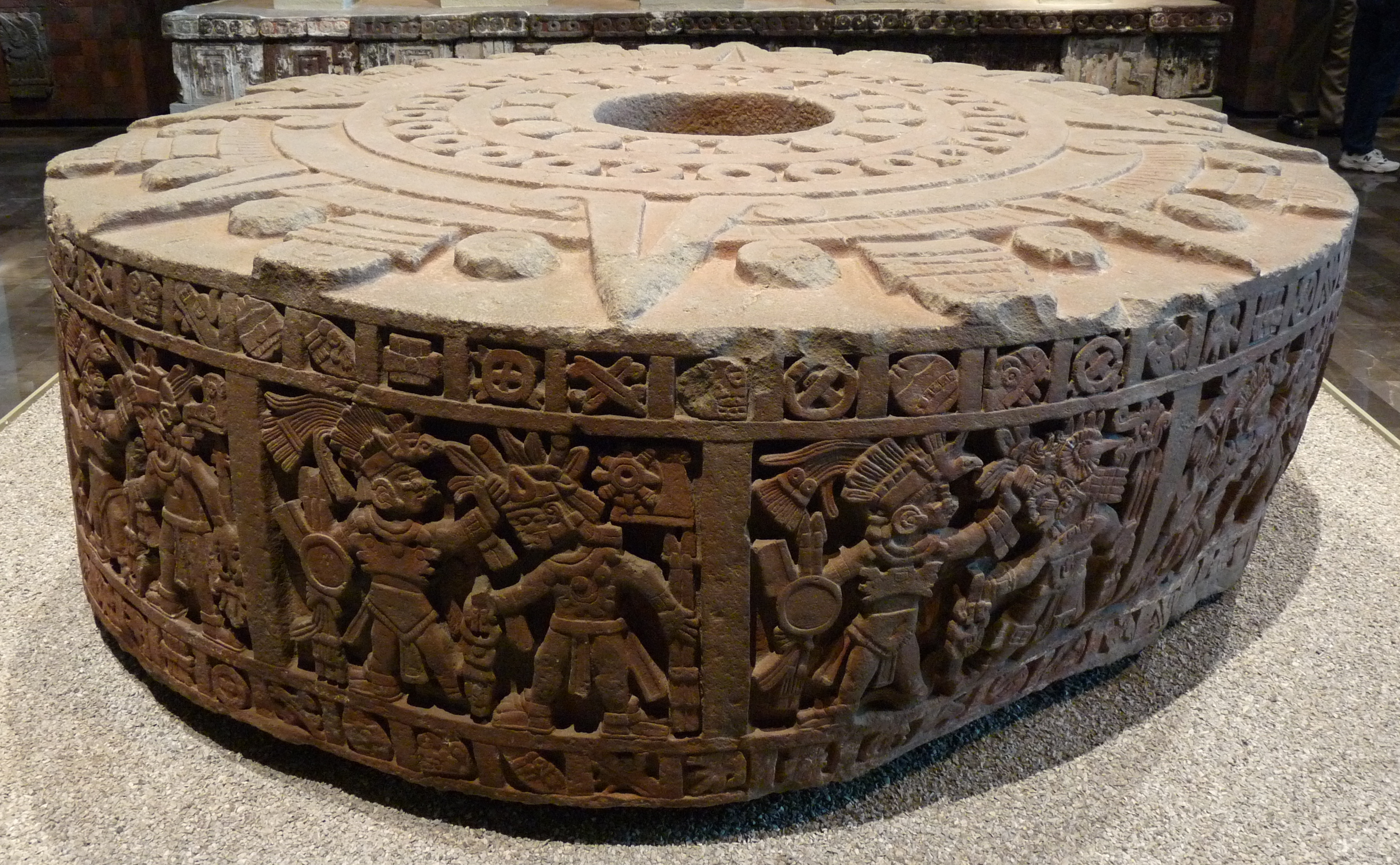
The Stone of Motecuhzoma I on display in Mexico City

The Stone of Motecuhzoma I is a pre-Columbian stone monolith dating back to the rule of Motecuhzoma I (1440-1469), the fifth Tlatoani (ruler) of Tenochtitlan. The monolith measures approximately 12 feet in diameter and 39 inches tall, and is also known as the Stone of Motecuhzoma Ilhuicamina, the Cuauhxicalli of Motecuhzoma Ilhuicamina, the Archbishop's Stone, the Ex-Arzobispado Stone, and the Sánchez-Nava Monolith. Historical sources refer to it simply as "temalacatl," literally meaning "round stone."

Motecuhzoma I, also known as Motecuhzoma Ilhuicamina, was the grandson of the first Tlaltoani of Tenochtitlan, succeeding Itzcoatl, and he turned the position of King into an imperial one. He is credited with the expansion and consolidation of the Aztec Empire (though he is often mistaken for his popular descendant Motecuhzoma II, who ruled during the Spanish conquest nearly a century later). In Nahuatl, Motecuhzoma means "He Becomes Angry Like a Lord," and Ilhuicamina means "Heaven Being Going Up."

Under Motecuhzoma I's rule, Tenochtitlan began to solidify its place as the capital city of the Aztec (Mexica) Empire. His conquests extended Aztec rule far beyond the Valley of Mexico, bringing in a large amount of tribute offerings. These conquests are depicted along the sides of the stone. Motecuhzoma I's rule and military expeditions also coincided with a rise in ritual human sacrifice, reflected in the sacrificial well on the top of the monolith.

== Discovery ==
The Stone of Motecuhzoma I was discovered in July 1988 under the colonial Archbishop's palace, or Palacio del Arzobispado, on Moneda Street in modern-day Mexico City. For this reason, the stone is sometimes referred to as the Archbishop's Stone. Built shortly after the Spanish destroyed the center of Tenochtitlan, the palace rested on many valuable pre-Columbian artifacts. The Palacio del Arzobispado was built in 1530 under the direction of Spanish Friar Juan de Zumárraga on the base of the destroyed Temple of Tezcatlipoca. The stone was unearthed during excavations under the palace, and immediately drew comparisons to the already-known Stone of Tizoc and Calendar Stone for its large size and circular shape.

Originally, the stone lay in front of the Temple of Tezcatlipoca. This placement was intentional — on the side panels of the stone, Motecuhzoma I is dressed as Tezcatlipoca dominating his enemies in battle. Currently, the stone is on display in the National Museum of Anthropology in Mexico City.

== Iconography ==
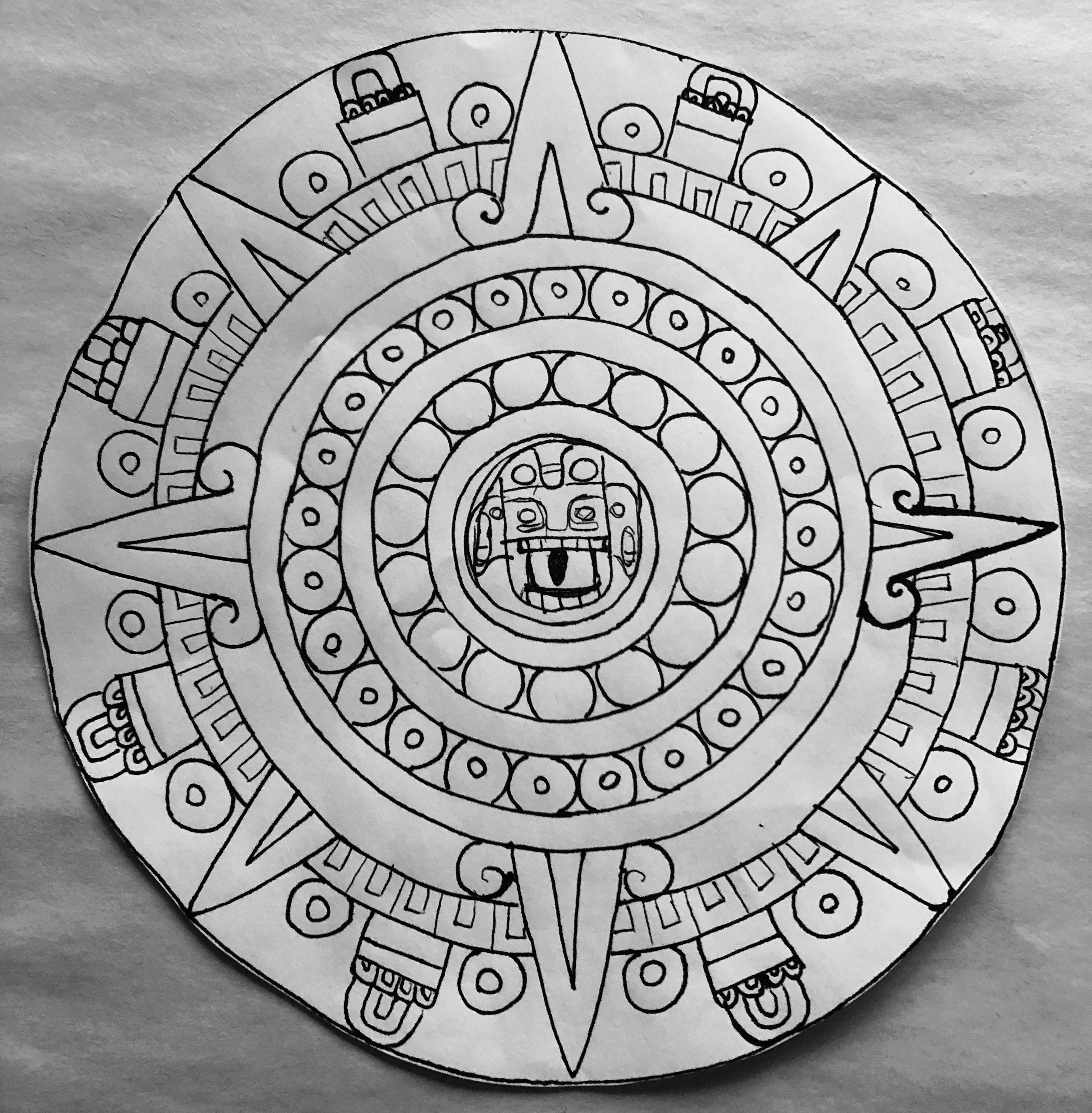
Line drawing of the solar disc on the top of the stone.

=== Upper face ===
The stone is approximately 12 feet in diameter and 3 feet tall, and was intended to be placed face-up. The solar disc on the upper face has a circular basin in the center, inside of which is the face of the sun deity Tōnatiuh, wearing his characteristic headdress. Tōnatiuh's mouth is open, and the tongue (now broken off) was intended to stick out in the form of a sacrificial knife. The protruding tongue was used as a crosspiece to tie sacrificial victims to. Surrounding the carving of Tōnatiuh is a band of concentric circles, representing the precious green stone, or jade. There are large arrows pointing in each of the cardinal directions, with smaller arrows in between. On the outer band, there is an alternating pattern of jade and cuauhxicalli, or "eagle-box," the stone receptacles used to house human hearts after sacrifice.

=== Side panels ===
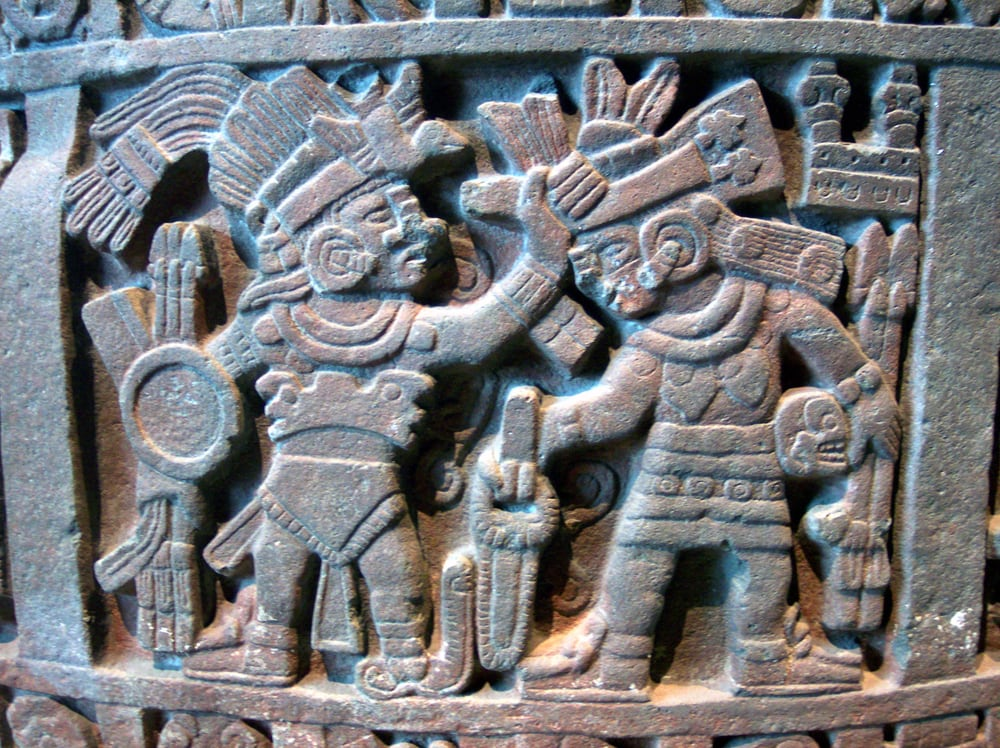
Panel depicting the conquest of Xochimilco. The location glyph for Xochimilco is visible in the top right corner, and Motecuhzoma I grasps his enemy's hair in his fist, signaling conquest.

The sides of the stone depict eleven individual scenes of conquest, sandwiched between two borders composed of small squares with symbols alluding to human sacrifice: crossed bones, skulls, hearts, knives, and human hands.

Each of the eleven side panels depicts Motecuhzoma I's conquest of another kingdom. In order, these kingdoms include Culhuacan, Tenayuca, Xochimilco, Chalco, Tamazulapan, Acolhuacan, Texaxic o Tepanoaya, Tlatelolco, Tonatiuhco, Mixtlan, and Cuetlaxtlan. Each kingdom is denoted by a glyph in the upper righthand corner of the panel. In his Historia de las Indias, Durán writes: "it was ordered that around [the stone] it should be depicted, as a border or frieze, every war they had fought up until then where the sun, with its protection and help, had granted them victories." In each panel, Motecuhzoma I is dressed as Tezcatlipoca and grasps his enemy's hair, symbolizing subjugation.

In the panel with the glyph for Chalco, the sun's ray also points to the Mexica emblem for Tlaltoani. This panel is significant as it allows scholars to attribute the stone to Motecuhzoma I. Throughout the 14th and early 15th centuries, the Chalca and the Aztecs fought the flower wars over the Chalca territory. Chalco was finally conquered by the Aztecs in 1465 under the reign of Motecuhzoma I.

== Ritual uses ==
The temalacatl are well-documented in historical texts as platforms for prisoners to engage in gladiatorial combat. Wounded warriors captured during Motecuhzoma I's conquests were likely sacrificed on the top of the stone.

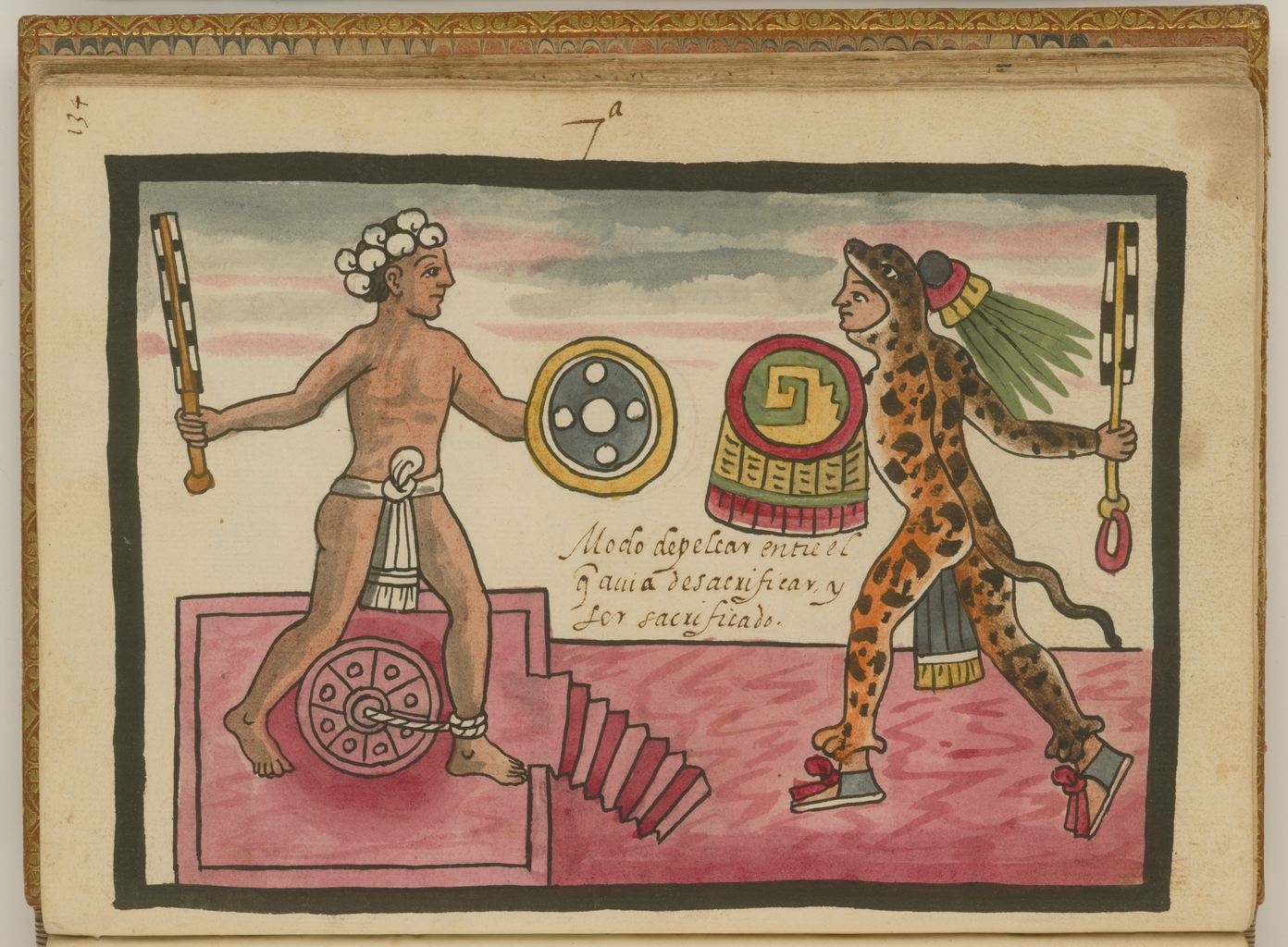
Depiction of a warrior tied to a temalácatl in the Tovar Codex (c. 1580). The rope around the captive's ankle attaches to the center of the stone.

Franciscan Friar Bernardino de Sahagún describes the sacrificial rituals associated with the stone: "They put slaves on this stone and then fought them with knives, they were tied by the waist in such a way they could reach the circumference of the stone and they gave them weapons with which to fight. This was a recurrent spectacle which people from all of the regions came to see." Friar Diego Durán seconds this account, writing that the Tlaltoani Motecuhzoma I invited common people from all over the valley of Mexico to attend the ceremonies. According to his accounts, a supply of "84,000 victims" (almost certainly an exaggeration intended to indicate an unlimited supply) captured from enemy populations were sacrificed over a period of four days, at the end of which "the temples and the entire city were covered by streams of blood." On the top of the stone, the solar disc has a circular basin in the center with rays extending from the stone's rim. By Durán's account, this was so that the blood of the sacrificed could be collected in the basin "for the likeness of the sun to enjoy."

Based on these documents and the stone's placement outside the Temple of Tezcatlipoca, the patron of the warrior, it is widely believed that gladiator sacrifice took place atop this stone. Furthermore, the stone was once painted entirely red, the color associated with Tezcatlipoca and the Eastern part of the Universe. The gladiators' blood was used to feed the representation of the sun in the center, to appease the gods and ensure that the sun would continue moving.

== Comparison to other monuments ==
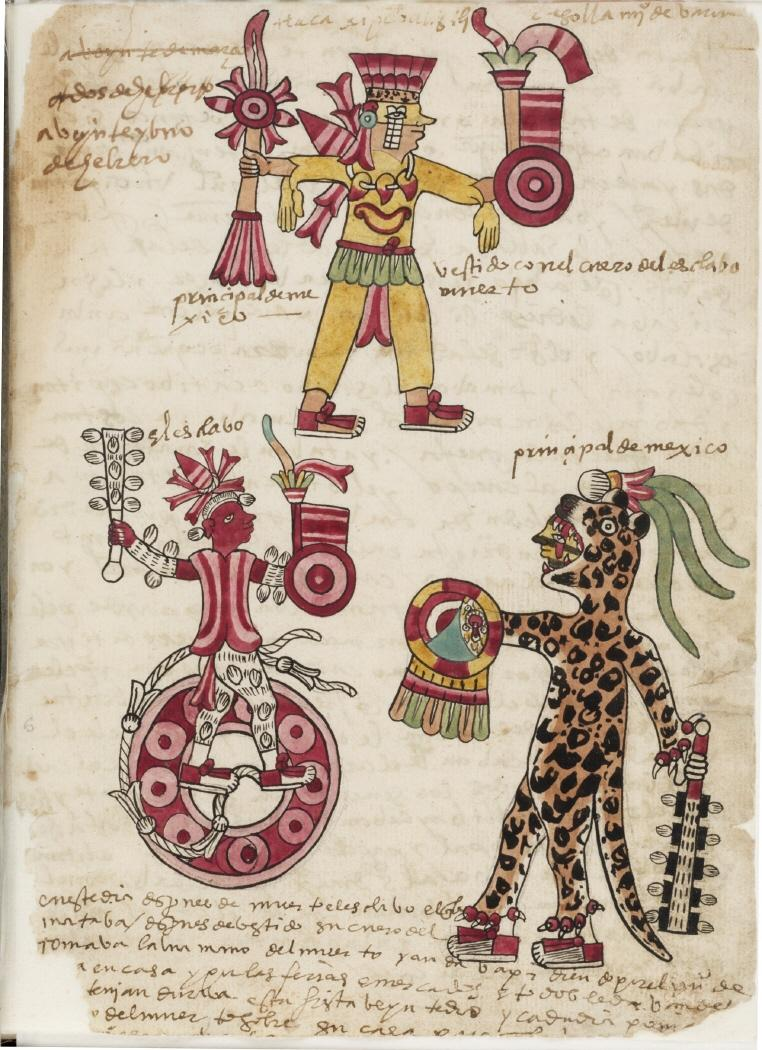
A depiction of an unidentified temalácatl in the Codex Tudela (c. 1540)

According to Templo Mayor archaeologist Eduardo Matos Moctezuma, there are two types of Aztec sculptures bearing the sun on top: Calendar Stones, and stones bearing carved scenes of military conquest around the edges. The Stone of Motecuhzoma I belongs to this second group, the temalácatl associated with gladiator sacrifice. The Stone of Tizoc is perhaps the best-known example of this, sharing many of the same iconographical features with the Stone of Motecuhzoma I. However, while the Stone of Motecuhzoma I depicts the Tlaloani (Motecuhzoma I) as Tezcatlipoca, the Stone of Tizoc depicts its Tlaolani (Tizoc) as Huitzilopochtli.

These two stones also share features with the famous Aztec Calendar Stone, also known as the Sun Stone. Like the two temalácatl, this stone is a large, round monolith with a solar carving on the top. All three monoliths were likely used as sacrificial stones to ensure the continued movement of the sun. However, the Aztec Calendar Stone has a key feature that neither of the others does: a calendar.

The Stone of Moctezuma I and Stone of Tizoc are both well-documented in historical sources. These sources also mention many other temalacatl that have yet to be discovered.
