= Temalacatl =

A temalacatl was a gladiatorial platform believed to have been used by the different civilizations of Mesoamerica, consisting of a large stone disc with a handle in the center where the prisoner was tied for further gladiatorial combat.

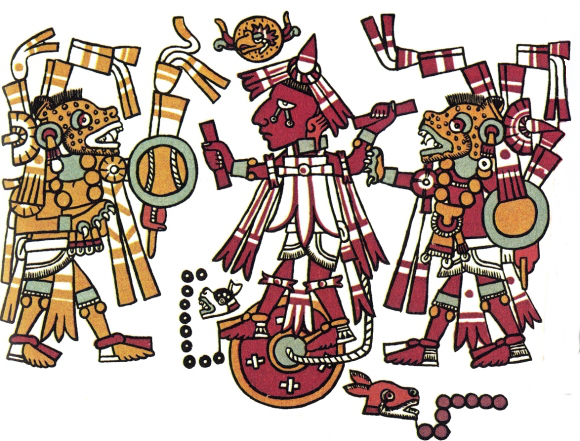
Representation of gladiatorial combat on a temalacatl.Codex Zouche-Nuttall.

== History ==
Monoliths created by the Aztecs assumed to be temalacatl include the Stone of Tizoc and the Stone of Motecuhzoma I, the latter being the larger of the two. There is debate over whether temalacatls were only combat sites or if these stones were also used as sacrificial receptacles where the extracted heart of the victim was deposited in a similar manner as a great cuauhxicalli. However, recent studies show that temalacatl were not used for the slaughter of prisoners, but were fighting platforms and monuments to the Mexica conquests. Some researchers suggest the Aztec sun stone could also be a temalacatl.
