= Xicalancatl =

Aztec giant

Xicalancatl, Xicallancatl or Xicalcoatl (From Nahuatl, 'Teacup Serpent') is one of the six giants sons of Mixcoatl and Tlaltecuhtli that populated the Earth after the Great Flood during the Fifth Sun in Aztec Mythology. The fourth son who settled on the coasts of the Gulf of Mexico, in the region called Xicallanco (from Nahuatl, 'in the region of the teacups or glass of dungeon), which confirms the abundance that there is in that region of such a vegetable product.

Surrounded the Earth by the seas and submerged in them for a long time, the old frog, with a thousand jaws and bloody tongues, and the strange name it takes, Tlaltecuhtli; Iztac-Mixcoatl, the fierce white cloud serpent, who lives in Citlalco, joins her in sweet collusion. And six tlacame with love engender; the six brothers on earth dwell and are the trunk of various races: the first-born, the giant Xelhua, of Itzocan and Epatlan, and Cuauquechollan, the cities he founded. Tenoch, the great Aztec claudillo, in Mexico stops the march of his people, and builds the great Tenochtitlan, a lake city. The strong Cuetlachoapan founds Ulmecatl, and gives its indolent people a seat. On the shores of the gulf, Xicalancatl, the brave Mixtecatl takes refuge. Of Mixtecapan in the sour lands; Otomitl, the xocoyotl [younger son], always lives in mountains near Mexico, and there it thrives in rich populations such as Tollan, Xilotepec and Otompan

— Gerónimo de Mendieta (1525–1604)
