= Quecholli =

Fourteenth veintena of the xiuhpōhualli

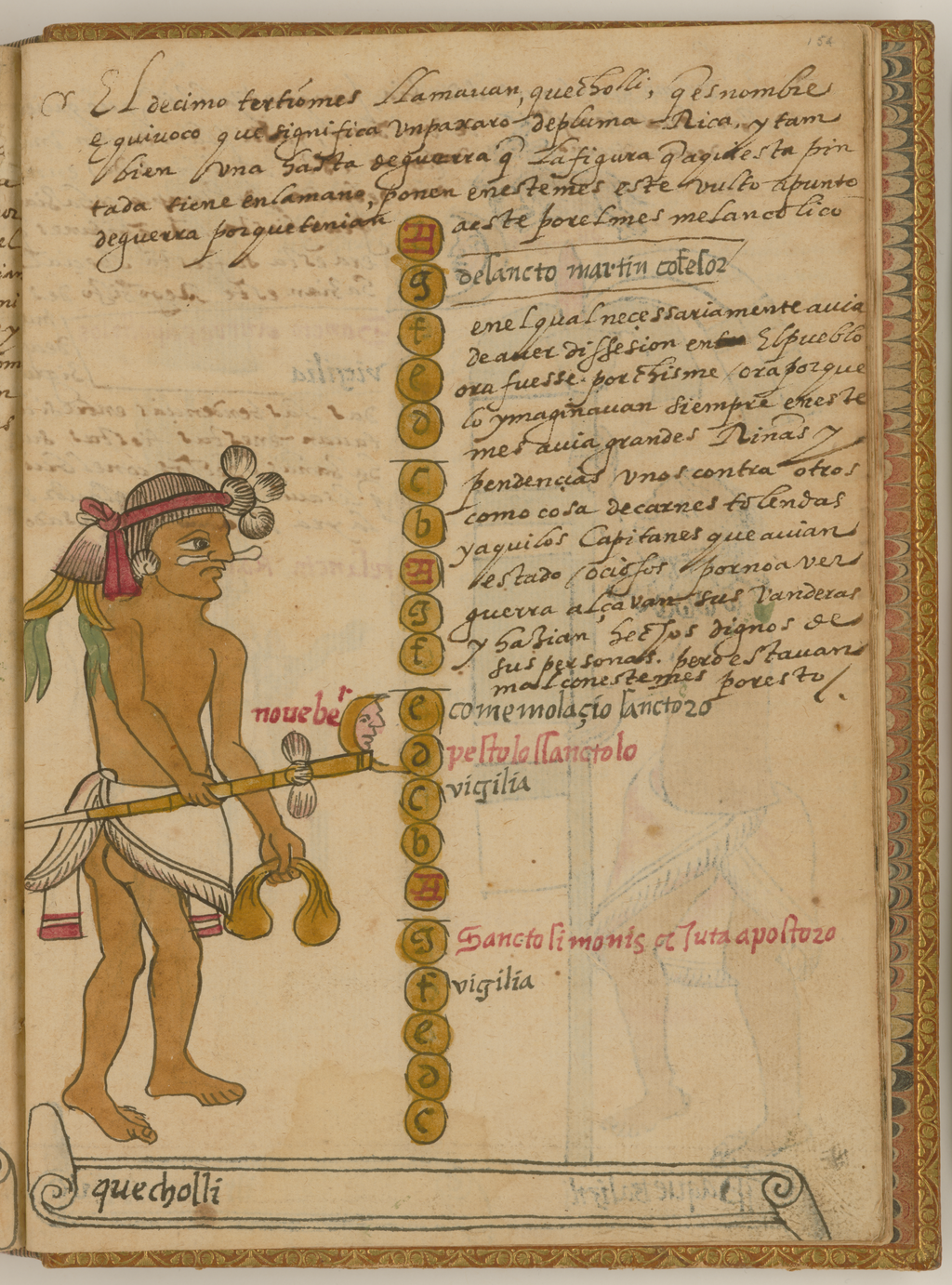

Quecholli is the name of the fourteenth month of the Aztec calendar. It is also a festival in the Aztec religion and the Principal deity is Mixcoatl. It is called the Precious Feather and hunting is done during this season.
