= Xochitlicue =

Mexica deity

Xochitlicue (meaning in Nahuatl 'the one that has her skirt of flowers') is the Aztec goddess of fertility, patroness of life and death, guide of rebirth, younger sister of Coatlicue, Huitzilopochtli's mother according Codex Florentine; and Chimalma, Quetzalcoatl's mother according to Codex Chimalpopoca. One of the three daughters of Tlaltecuhtli and Tlalcihuatl, the couple of the earth gods created by the Tezcatlipocas.

Mother of the twins Xochipilli, 'Prince of Flowers'; and Xochiquetzal, 'Precious Feather Flower', the goddess of beauty and love.

The gloss says that this age began in Tula, there were 5,042 years of intense famine and it rained blood. People died of horror. Here the wretched pretend certain dreams of their blindness by saying that a god who called himself Citlallatonac [Star shine] —which is that sign seen in the sky, the so-called Camino de Santiago or Milky Way— sent an ambassador from heaven with an embassy to a virgin who was in Tula [...], whose name was Chimalman, who had two sisters, one Xochitlicue and the other Coatlicue (Codex Vatican A. Translation of Anders, Jansen and Reyes, 1996: 69). When the ambassadors arrived, Chimalman's sisters died of horror and she had a son, Quetzalcoatl, who caused the hurricanes and was also called Citoladuale.

During the time of the Fourth Sun, the supreme divinity sent a messenger to Chimalma in Tollan to warn her that she would conceive an unrelated child of a man. Chimalma was living with her two sisters, Xochiltlicue and Coatlicue.

— Codex Ríos
