= Mixcoatl =

Aztec deity

- God of the Hunt, Wilderness, Wildlife, War, Tribes, Sky and Stars; Personification of the Milky Way
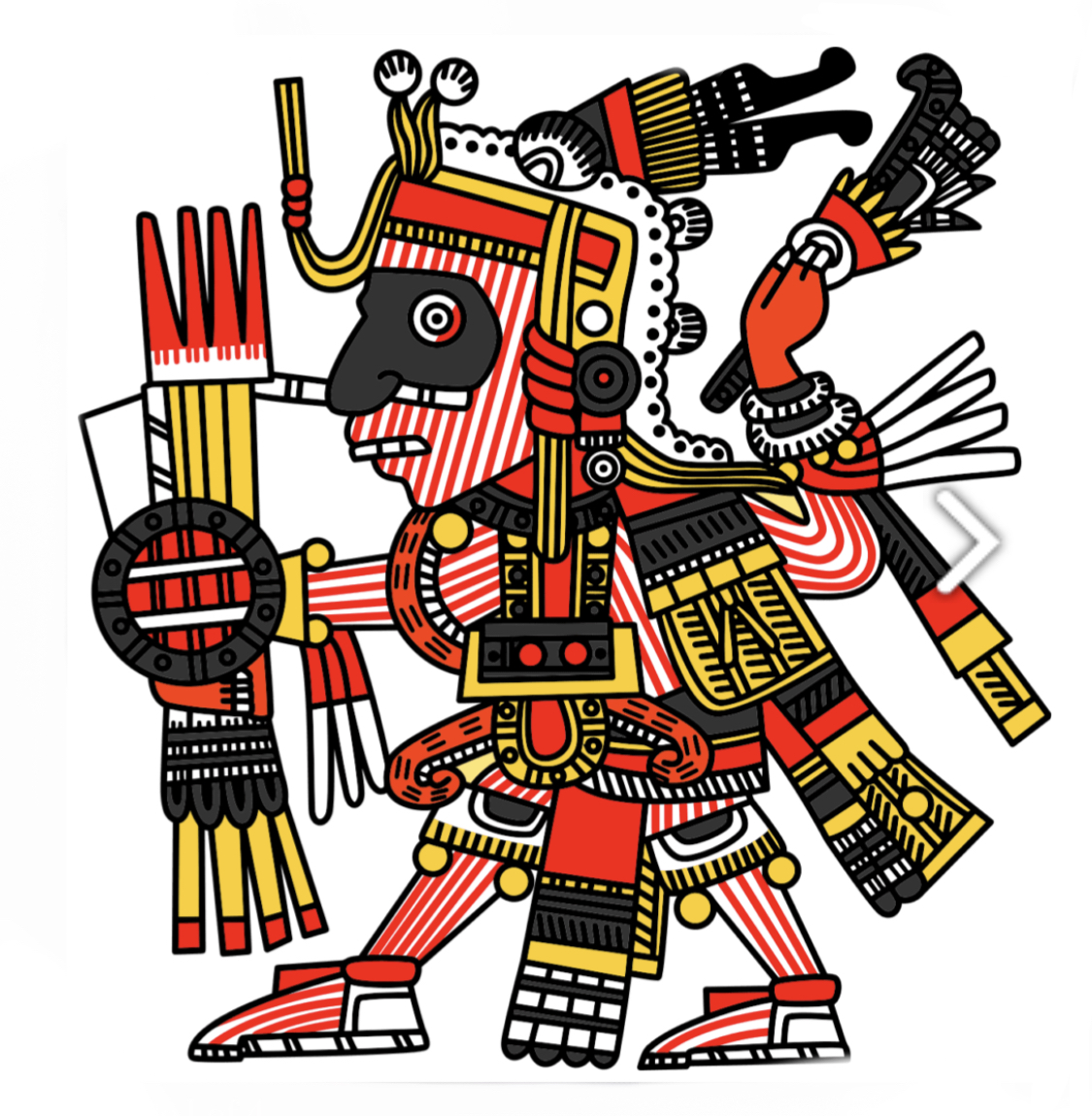
- Mixcoatl as depicted in the Codex Borgia
- Other names: Itzac-Mixcoatl, Camaxtli, Camaxtle, Tlatlauhaqui-Tezcatlipoca, Mixcoa
- Abode: Ilhuicatl-Nanatzcayan (Eighth Heaven)
- Gender: Male
- Region: Mesoamerica
- Ethnic group: Aztec, Tlaxcaltec, Nicarao (Nahua)
- Festivals: Quecholli

Genealogy
- Parents: • Created by Tezcatlipoca and Quetzalcoatl (Codex Zumarraga) • Tonacatecuhtli and Tonacacihuatl (as Camaxtle)
- Siblings: None
- Consort: • Chimalma (Codex Chimalpopoca) • Coatlicue (Codex Florentine) • Ilancueye (Codex Mendieta)
- Children: • With Chimalma: Quetzalcoatl and Xolotl (Codex Chimalpopoca) • With Coatlicue: Huitzilopochtli, Coyolxauhqui, Centzon Huitznahuac (Codex Florentine) • With Ilancueye: the giants Xelhua, Tenoch, Ulmecatl, Xicalancatl, Mixtecatl, Otomitl (Codex Mendieta) • With Tlalcihuatl or Coatlicue: Centzon Mimixcoa (Codex Ramirez)

Equivalents
- Otomi: Et’axäkak’ëngüi

Mixcoatl (Nahuatl languages: Mixcōhuātl, [miʃˈkoːwaːt͡ɬ] from mixtli [ˈmiʃt͡ɬi] "cloud" and cōātl [ˈkoːaːt͡ɬ] "serpent"), or Camaxtle [kaˈmaʃt͡ɬe] or Camaxtli, was the god of the hunt and identified with the Milky Way, the stars, and the heavens in several Mesoamerican cultures. He was the patron deity of the Otomi, the Chichimecs, and several groups that claimed descent from the Chichimecs. Under the name of Camaxtli, Mixcoatl was worshipped as the central deity of Huejotzingo and Tlaxcala.

== Representation ==
Mixcoatl is most often depicted wearing a black mask and with distinctive red and white pin stripes painted on his body. These features are shared with Tlahuizcalpantecuhtli, the Lord of the Dawn, god of the morning star, as well as Itzpapalotl, goddess of infant mortality who was sometimes said to be his mother. Unlike Tlahuizcalpanteuctli, Mixcoatl can usually be distinguished by his hunting gear, which included a bow and arrows, and a net or basket for carrying dead game.

== Mythology ==
Mixcoatl was one of four children of Tonacatecutli, meaning "Lord of Sustenance," an aged creator god, and Cihuacoatl, a fertility goddess and the patroness of midwives. Sometimes Mixcoatl was worshipped as the "Red" aspect of the god Tezcatlipoca, the "Smoking Mirror," who was the god of sorcerers, rulers, and warriors. In one story, Tezcatlipoca transformed himself into Mixcoatl and invented the fire drill by revolving the heavens around their axes, bringing fire to humanity. Along with this cosmic fire drill, Mixcoatl was the first to strike fire with flint. These events made Mixcoatl a god of the Milky Way, along with war, and the hunt.

Mixcoatl was the father of 400 sons, collectively known as the Centzon Huitznahua, who ended up having their hearts eaten by Huitzilopochtli. The Centzon Huitznahua met their demise when they, and their sister Coyolxauhqui, after finding their mother Coatlicue pregnant, conspired to kill her. However, as they attacked she gave birth to a fully formed and armed Huitzilopochtli, who proceeded to kill his half-siblings. Mixcoatl was also related to 400 more gods, the Centzonmimixcoa, whom, together with his 3 brothers (all different from the ones named above) and their sister, he slew by ambush. Mixcoatl was also thought of as being the father of another important deity, Quetzalcoatl, the feathered serpent.

Quetzalcoatl's father Mixcoatl was murdered; Quetzalcoatl was informed by Cozcaquauhtli that "the uncles who had killed [his] father were Apanecatl, Zolton, and Cuilton."

The Codex Mendieta gives Mixcoatl six giant children, counted among the Quinametzin:

Surrounded the Earth by the seas and submerged in them for a long time, the old frog, with a thousand jaws and bloody tongues, and the strange name it takes, Tlaltecuhtli; Iztac-Mixcoatl, the fierce white cloud serpent, who lives in Citlalco, joins her in sweet collusion. And six tlacame with love engender; the six brothers on earth dwell and are the trunk of various races: the first-born, the giant Xelhua, of Itzocan and Epatlan, and Cuauquechollan, the cities he founded. Tenoch, the great Aztec claudillo, in Mexico stops the march of his people, and builds the great Tenochtitlan, a lake city. The strong Cuetlachoapan founds Ulmecatl, and gives its indolent people a seat. On the shores of the gulf, Xicalancatl, the brave Mixtecatl takes refuge. Of Mixtecapan in the sour lands; Otomitl, the xocoyotl [younger son], always lives in mountains near Mexico, and there it thrives in rich populations such as Tollan, Xilotepec and Otompan

— Gerónimo de Mendieta (1525–1604)

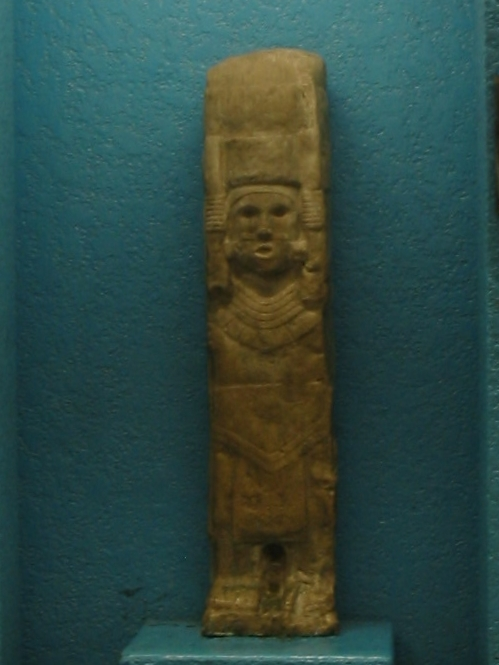
Replica of statue of Mixcoac as displayed in Metro Bellas Artes in Mexico City. The accompanying plaque translates as" SCULPTURE OF MIXCOAC - Mexica-Huasteca culture - Late Post-Classic Period - Description: sculpture with the image of Mixcoatl, patron of the hunt and one of the most important gods of war in ancient Mexico. He is considered to be the father of Quetzalcoatl. Original is in the Castle of Teayo, Veracruz"

== Xipetotec, Camaxtle, Mixcoatl or Red Tezcatlipoca ==
Originally the name of the first son of the creative couple Ometecuhtli and Omecihuatl is Tlatlauhca or Tlatlauhaqui-Tezcatlipoca (Red Tezcatlipoca), "Smoking red mirror." Of obscure origin, this god is honored by the Tlaxcalans and Huejocinas with the name of Camaxtli (Camaxtle), and apparently a deity of Zapotlan, Xalisco, is widely known in almost all of Mesoamerica with the name of Xipe Totec, 'Our Lord, the Flayed One'. His body is dyed yellow on one side and lined on the other; his face is carved, superficially divided into two parts by a narrow strip that runs from the forehead to the jawbone. His head wears a kind of hood of different colors with tassels that hang down his back. The Tlaxcala myth that refers to Camaxtle, a god identified as Xipe-Totec himself

Camaxtle begins a war against the Shires and defeats them. The war lasts until 1 acatl, when Camaxtle is defeated, after this failure he meets one of the women created by Yayauhqui-Tezcatlipoca, called Chimalma, and with her he conceives five children, one of whom is Ce Acatl Topiltzin Quetzalcoatl, who governs Tula (Another myth says that it is Yayauhqui-Tezcatlipoca, the enemy who in his invocation of Mixcoatl impregnates Chimalma)

It is difficult to discern if Camaxtle is the same Tlatlauhqui Tezcatlipoca-Xipetotec or Yayauhqui-Tezcatlipoca (Black Tezcatlipoca) who changes his name to Mixcoatl; or Huitzilopochtli himself as identified by some informants and authors. He is related to fire and hunting. After the destruction of the earth by water, came chaos. Everything was desolation. Humanity had died and the heavens were over the earth. When the gods saw that the heavens had fallen, they resolved to reach the center of the Earth, opening four subterranean paths for this, and to enter these paths to lift them up. To reward such a great action, Tonacacihuatl and Tonacatecuhtli made their children the lords of the heavens and the stars, and the path that Tezcatlipoca and Quetzalcoatl traveled was marked by the Milky Way. And this great nebula was also called Mixcoatl or Iztac-Mixcoatl, 'white cloud snake'

Jerónimo de Mendieta determines that Iztac-Mixcoatl is the personification of the Milky Way, the inhabitant of Chicomoztoc that the Nahuas call ‘White Cloud Serpent’, since such is the shape of the great nebula in the sky. And Ilancueye is nothing more than the personification of the Earth.

== Centzon Mimixcoa ==
In Ce Tecpatl, after the Creation of the Fifth Sun in Teotihuacan, Camaxtle, one of the four gods, ascended to the Eighth Heaven and created four men and one woman to feed the Sun; But barely formed, they fell into the water, they returned to the sky and there was no war, frustrated by this attempt, Camaxtle struck a cane on a rock, and at the blow 400 Chichimecs Mimixcoa sprouted that populated the earth before the Aztecs. Camaxtle was able to do penance on the rock, drawing blood with maguey spikes, tongue and ears, and prayed to the gods that the four men and one woman created in the eighth heaven would come down to kill the barbarians to feed to the Sun.

The four men and one woman created in the Eighth Heaven are the five Mimixcoa who would later sacrifice the 400 Mimixcoa, called Chichimecs or Otomies.

In Ce Tecpatl, the Mimixcoa were born, their mother Iztac-Chalchiuhtlicue went into a cave (Chicomoztoc or Tlalocan) and gave birth to five other Mimixcoa called Cuauhtlicoauh; Mixcoatl; Cuitlachcihuatl; Tlotepe; and Apantecuhtli. After spending four days in the water, the five Mimixcoa were suckled by Mecitli, who by the text identifies with the Earth Goddess (Tlaltecuhtli or Coatlicue). And immediately the Sun ordered the 400 Mimixcoa; The Sun Tonatiuh gives them arrows and says: "Here it is with what they will serve me to drink, with what they will feed, and a shield. And the precious arrows cast in quetzal t-shirt feathers; in heron rowing feathers; in t-shirt feathers of zacuam; in tlauhquechol t-shirt feathers; and in xiuhtototl t-shirt feathers; and also she, the Earth (Tlaltecuhtli or Coatlicue), who is your mother", but the Centzon Mimixcoa did not do their duty, instead they get drunk on tzihuactli wine - a small maguey and have sex with women. And immediately, the Sun also orders the five who were born last, immediately gives them the maguey arrow and gives them the divine shield. The five Mimixcoa climb a mesquite tree where the 400 discover them, they exclaim: "Who are these who are such as us?", then the five hide in specific places: Cuauhtlicoauh takes shelter in a tree; Mixcoatl on the ground; Tlotepe in the mount; Apantecuhtli in the water; and Cuitlachcihuatl in a court of the Tlachtli ball court. Finally, the Centzon Mimixcoa are defeated by his five younger brothers, who served the Sun Tonatiuh, gave him a drink.

Anciently in the North there was a place of origins called Chicomoztoc, the seven caves. Within these caverns lived the Four Hundred Mimixcoa, a turbulent group of titans born of the Earth Goddess (Tlaltecuhtli or Coatlicue). Their father, the Sun (Tonatiuh) taught them the use of weapons so they might hunt and supply their divine parents with nourishment. But the Mimixcoa in their arrogance defied their parents, lived wantonly, and drank a wine madre from cactus. In response to the situation, which became ever more unbearable, the Earth Mother bore five additional Mimixcoa who were destined to avenge their father, and provided these lateborn children with sharper and more deadly weapons. The leader of the group is a synoptic figure and includes them all, hence his name Mixcoatl. In the myth Tezcatlipoca is said to have changed himself into Mixcoatl in the second year after the great flood at the end of the fourth aeon, when the sky crashed down up the earth. Acting then as Mixcoatl, the divine one proceeded to create fire by drilling with a stick into a fireboard. This was the first light, for the Fifth Sun had not yet been created. The myth is evidently at pains to point out a fundamental relationship between the supreme god Tezcatlipoca and Mixcoatl. Camaxtle-Mixcoatl, in fact, is a perfect replica of that god of the dawn in both his trappings (as depicted in the codices) and in his mythology, which makes him the father of Ce Acatl Topiltzin Quetzalcoatl.

— Burr Cartwright Brundage

== Ritual associations ==
Quecholli, the 14th veintena, the 20-day Aztec month (November 19th Julian calendar, November 29th Gregorian calendar), was dedicated to Mixcoatl. The celebration for this month consisted of hunting and feasting in the countryside. The hunters would take the form of Mixcoatl by dressing like him, kindling a new fire to roast the hunted game. Along with these practices, a man and woman would be sacrificed to Mixcoatl at his temple.

== Modern associations and references ==
In modern scientific nomenclature, the names Mixcoatl–Camaxtli have been assigned to:

- Camaxtli Patera, one of the paterae (shallow craters) on the Jovian moon of Io
- Pseudoeurycea mixcoatl, a species of lungless salamander endemic to Mexico
- Mixcoatlus barbouri, a species of viper endemic to Mexico (previously Cerrophidion barbouri).
- Mixcoatlus browni, a species of viper endemic to Mexico (previously Agkistrodon browni).

== See also ==
- Xipe Totec
