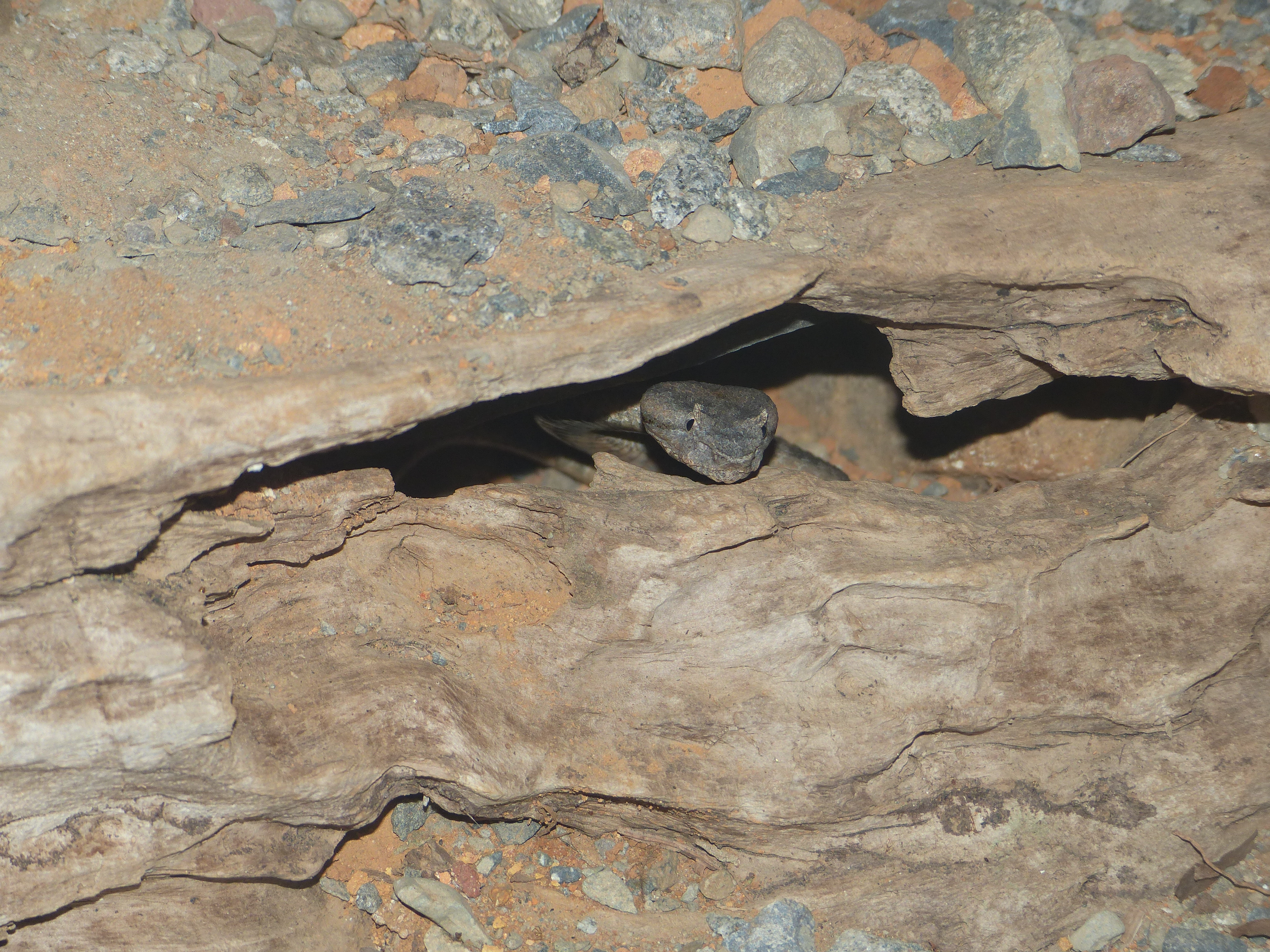

Conservation status
- Endangered (IUCN 3.1)

Scientific classification
- Kingdom: Animalia
- Phylum: Chordata
- Class: Reptilia
- Order: Squamata
- Suborder: Serpentes
- Family: Viperidae
- Genus: Mixcoatlus
- Species: M. melanurus

Binomial name
- Mixcoatlus melanurus (L. Müller, 1924)

Synonyms
- Trimeresurus melanurus L. Müller, 1924; Bothrops melanura – Amaral, 1930; Trimeresurus garciai H.M. Smith, 1940; Trimeresurus garciae – Taylor, 1944; Bothrops melanurus – Hoge & Romano-Hoge, 1981; Porthidium melanurum – Campbell & Lamar, 1989; Ophryacus melanurus – Gutberlet, 1998

= Mixcoatlus melanurus =

Species of snake

Common names: black-tailed horned pit viper.

Mixcoatlus melanurus is a pit viper species endemic to the mountains of southern Mexico. No subspecies are currently recognized.

== Description ==
Adults grow to between 37.5 and 50 centimetres (14 3/4 and 19 5/8 inches) in length and have a moderately stout build. In Mexico, it is called a necazcoatl, from the Nahuatl words necaztli and coatl which means "eared-serpent" referring to its "horns".

== Geographic range ==
It is found in two Mexican states, southern Puebla and Oaxaca, at elevations of 1,600–2,400 m (5,200–7,900 ft). The type locality given is "Mexico".

== Conservation status ==
This species is classified as Endangered (EN) on the IUCN Red List of Threatened Species with the following criteria: B1ab(iii) (v3.1, 2001). A species is listed as such when the best available evidence indicates that the geographic range, in the form of extent of occurrence, is estimated to be less than 5,000 km^{2} (1,900 sq mi), that estimates indicate it to be severely fragmented or known to exist at no more than 5 locations, and that a continuing decline has been observed, inferred or projected, in area, extent and/or quality of habitat. It is therefore considered to be facing a very high risk of extinction in the wild. In 2007 when it was last assessed, the population trend was down.

== Behavior ==
Terrestrial.
