= Tenoch =

14th-century ruler of the Mexica

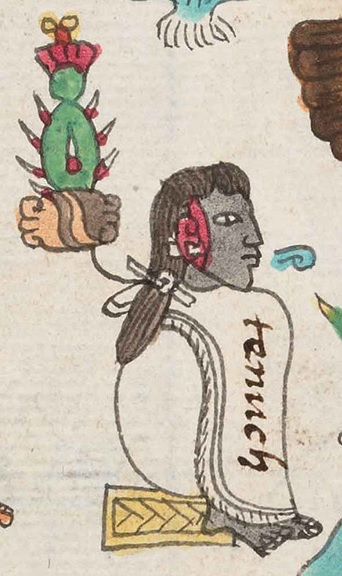
- Depiction of Tenoch in the Codex Mendoza.
- Reign: c. 1325–1375 (?)
- Born: c. 1299
- Died: 1350, 1367 or 1375
- Father: Iztac-Mixcoatl
- Mother: Ilancueye

Tenoch (or Tenuch, modern Nahuatl pronunciation) was a ruler of the Mexica (Aztecas) in the 14th century during the Aztec travels from Aztlán to Tenochtitlan. The settlers of Tenochtitlan were originally referred to as Tenochca, then the Mexica. Tenoch was a respected chief who was elected to power by the council of elders and died sometime between 1350 and 1375, depending on the source.

Tenoch was one of nine Mexica leaders who were told how the Mexica could gain support from the forces of nature. After traveling southward for 200 years, the Mexica found the sign. In honor of their leader, they named a small, reedy island in Lake Texcoco Tenochtitlan. Tenochtitlan soon became the capital of the Aztec Empire. The Nahuatl symbols of his name are found in the Mexican flag: Tetl: "rock", and Nochtli: "prickly pear cactus".

There is disagreement regarding whether Tenoch was a mythological person or a real Mexica leader who was later mythologized. According to one source, Tenoch's father was Iztac Mixcoatl, who had a total of seven sons with two wives, six of them giants:

Surrounded the Earth by the seas and submerged in them for a long time, the old frog, with a thousand jaws and bloody tongues, and the strange name it takes, Tlaltecuhtli; Iztac-Mixcoatl, the fierce white cloud serpent, who lives in Citlalco, joins her in sweet collusion. And six tlacame with love engender; the six brothers on earth dwell and are the trunk of various races: the first-born, the giant Xelhua, of Itzocan and Epatlan, and Cuauquechollan, the cities he founded. Tenoch, the great Aztec claudillo, in Mexico stops the march of his people, and builds the great Tenochtitlan, a lake city. The strong Cuetlachoapan founds Ulmecatl, and gives its indolent people a seat. On the shores of the gulf, Xicalancatl, the brave Mixtecatl takes refuge. Of Mixtecapan in the sour lands; Otomitl, the xocoyotl [younger son], always lives in mountains near Mexico, and there it thrives in rich populations such as Tollan, Xilotepec and Otompan

— Gerónimo de Mendieta (1525–1604)
