= Xelhua =

Aztec giant

For the CMLL luchador named after this mythological entity, see Xelhua (wrestler).

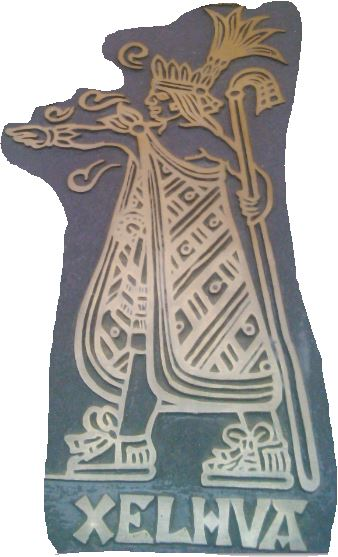
Xelhua

Xelhua is one of the seven giants in Aztec mythology who escaped the flood by ascending the mountain of Tlaloc in the terrestrial paradise and afterwards built the Great Pyramid of Cholula. One of the six giants sons of Mixcoatl, the personification of the Milky Way:

Surrounded the Earth by the seas and submerged in them for a long time, the old frog, with a thousand jaws and bloody tongues, and the strange name it takes, Tlaltecuhtli; Iztac-Mixcoatl, the fierce white cloud serpent, who lives in Citlalco, joins her in sweet collusion. And six tlacame with love engender; the six brothers on earth dwell and are the trunk of various races: the first-born, the giant Xelhua, of Itzocan and Epatlan, and Cuauquechollan, the cities he founded. Tenoch, the great Aztec claudillo, in Mexico stops the march of his people, and builds the great Tenochtitlan, a lake city. The strong Cuetlachoapan founds Ulmecatl, and gives its indolent people a seat. On the shores of the gulf, Xicalancatl, the brave Mixtecatl takes refuge. Of Mixtecapan in the sour lands; Otomitl, the xocoyotl [younger son], always lives in mountains near Mexico, and there it thrives in rich populations such as Tollan, Xilotepec and Otompan

— Gerónimo de Mendieta (1525–1604)

== See also ==
- Mixcoatl
- Tower of Babel
- List of Mesoamerican pyramids
