= Mixcoatlus barbouri =

Conservation status
- Endangered (IUCN 3.1)

Scientific classification
- Kingdom: Animalia
- Phylum: Chordata
- Class: Reptilia
- Order: Squamata
- Suborder: Serpentes
- Family: Viperidae
- Genus: Mixcoatlus
- Species: M. barbouri

Binomial name
- Mixcoatlus barbouri (Dunn, 1919)

Synonyms
- Lachesis barbouri Dunn, 1919; Bothrops barbouri — Amaral, 1930; Trimeresurus barbouri — H.M. Smith, 1941; Porthidium barbouri — Campbell, 1988; Cerrophidion barbouri — Campbell & Lamar, 1992; Mixcoatlus barbouri — Jadin et al., 2011

Species of snake

Common names: Barbour's montane pit viper, Barbour's pit viper

Mixcoatlus barbouri is a pit viper species endemic to Mexico. No subspecies are currently recognized.

== Etymology ==
The specific name, barbouri, is in honor of American herpetologist Thomas Barbour.

== Description ==
Adults of M. barbouri generally grow to 30–40 cm (11¾-15¾ inches) in total length (including tail), with a maximum recorded total length of 51.0 cm (20 in). The species is terrestrial and moderately stout.

The color pattern consists of a blackish ground color, overlaid with a vague dorsal zig-zag stripe that extends down the flanks, which looks like a series of triangular markings. The skin between the scales is rust-colored, as are the sides of the head.

== Geographic range ==
Mixcoatlus barbouri is found in the highlands of the Sierra Madre del Sur in the state of Guerrero, Mexico.

The type locality given is "Omilteme [or Omiltemi], Guerrero, Mexico".

== Habitat ==
The preferred habitats of M. barbouri are mountain areas at some 9,000 feet (2,740 m) elevation in rocky pine forests and clearings with bunch grass.

== Conservation status ==
The species M. barbouri is classified as Endangered (EN) on the IUCN Red List of Threatened Species with the following criteria: B1ab(iii) (v3.1, 2001). A species is listed as such when the best available evidence indicates that the geographic range, in the form of extent of occurrence, is estimated to be less than 5,000 km² (1,930 mi²), estimates indicate the population is severely fragmented or known to exist at no more than five locations, and a continuing decline has been observed, inferred or projected in the area, extent and/or quality of habitat. It is therefore considered to be facing a very high risk of extinction in the wild. The population trend is down. Year assessed: 2007.
