= Tlaltecuhtli =

Aztec deity

- Earth monster/earth god
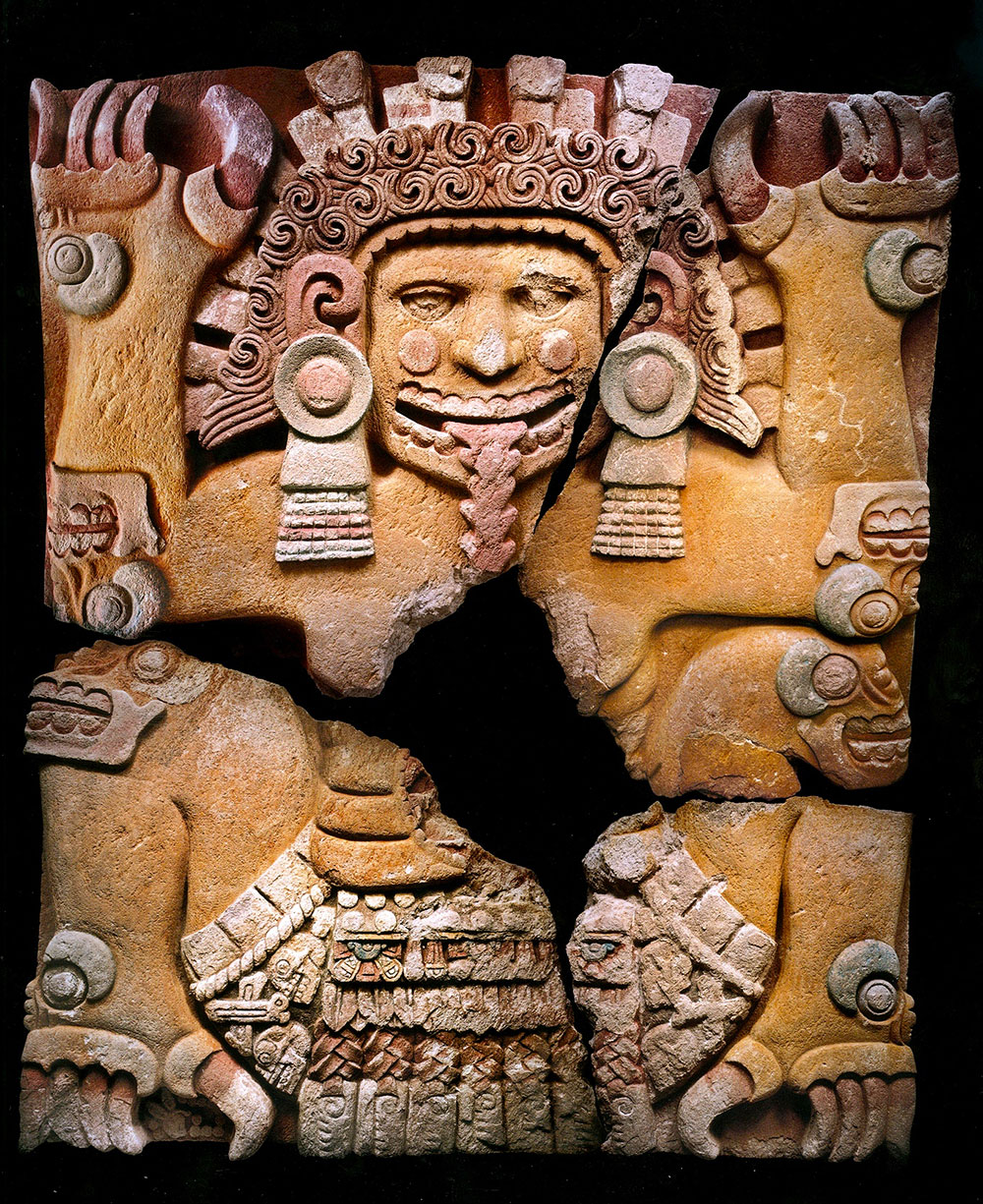
- Monolith of Tlaltecuhtli discovered in Mexico City in 2006 (1502 CE)
- Abode: Tlalticpac
- Symbol: Earth
- Gender: Female
- Region: Mesoamerica
- Ethnic group: Aztec (Nahua)

Genealogy
- Parents: Created by the Tezcatlipocas (Codex Zumarraga)
- Siblings: None
- Consort: Tlalcihuatl as female form (Codex Zumarraga)
- Children: • With Tlalcihuatl: Coatlicue, Chimalma, Xochitlicue (Codex Ríos) • With Mixcoatl: the giants Xelhua, Tenoch, Ulmecatl, Xicalancatl, Mixtecatl, Otomitl (Codex Mendieta)

Equivalents
- Otomi: Hmühai

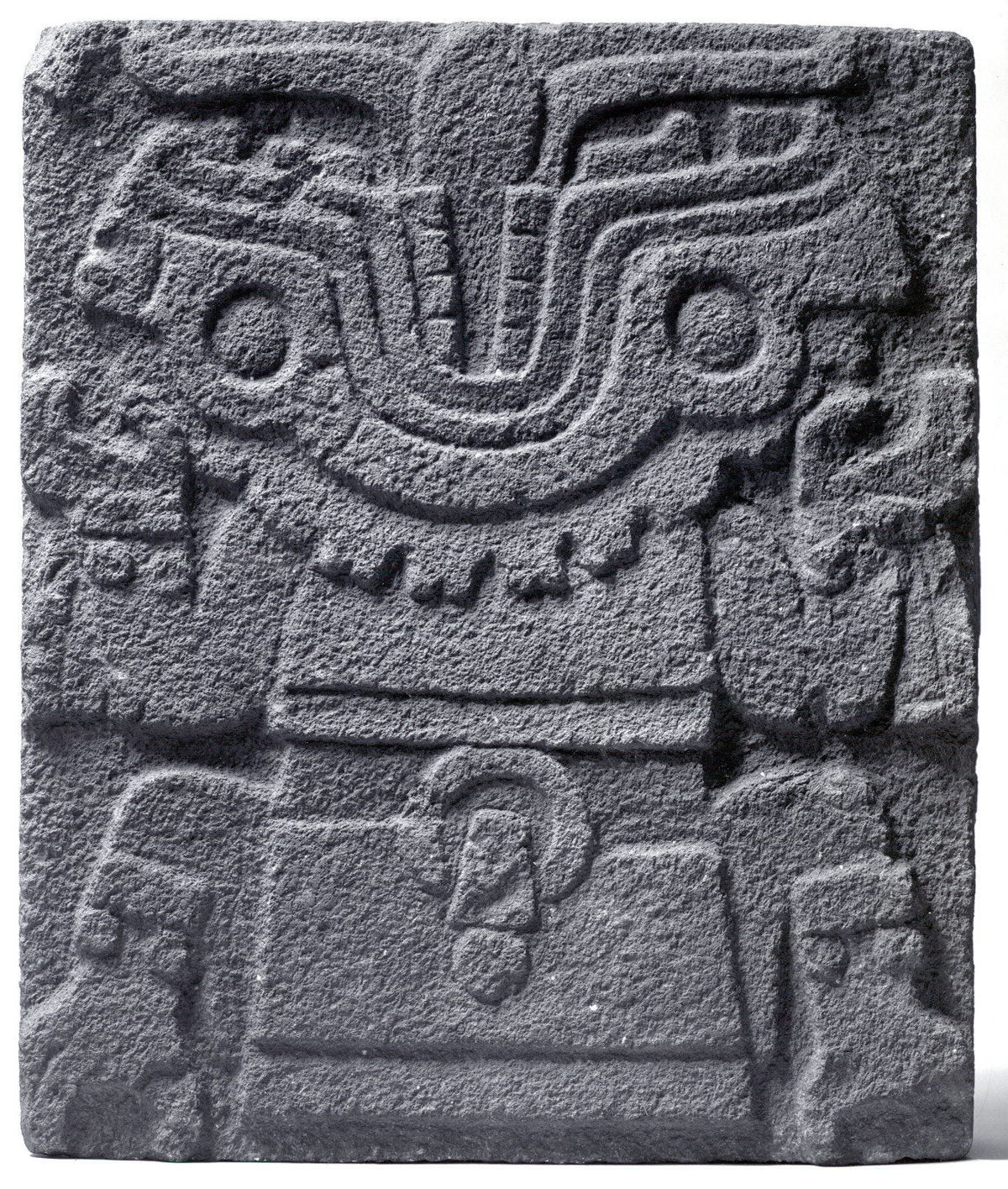
Tlaltecuhtli's head is shown flung back with a serpent tongue and a sacrificial knife between her teeth

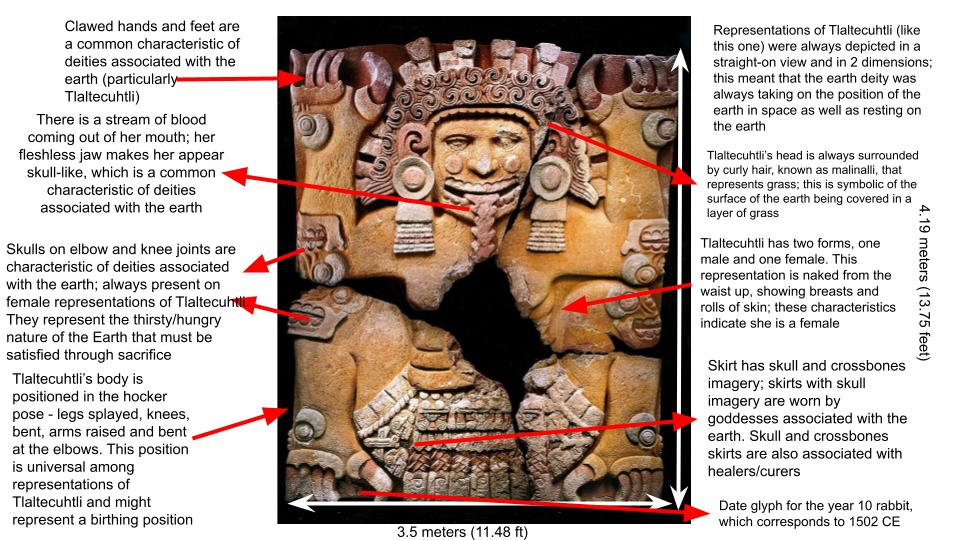
Annotations detailing the iconography of the Tlaltecuhtli Monolith (located at the Museum of the Templo Mayor in Mexico City, Mexico)

Tlaltecuhtli (Classical Nahuatl Tlāltēuctli, Nahuatl pronunciation: [t͡ɬaːl.teːkʷ.t͡ɬi]) is a pre-Columbian Mesoamerican deity worshipped primarily by the Mexica (Aztec) people. Sometimes referred to as the "earth monster," Tlaltecuhtli's dismembered body was the basis for the world in the Aztec creation story of the fifth and final cosmos. In carvings, Tlaltecuhtli is often depicted as an anthropomorphic being with splayed arms and legs. Considered the source of all living things, she had to be kept sated by human sacrifices which would ensure the continued order of the world.

In the creation of the Earth, the gods did not tire of admiring the cosmic ocean, no oscillations, no movements, but Tezcatlipoca and Quetzalcoatl realized creation needed dry land that could be inhabited. And for this, they defeated Cipactli, making her into the world.

That primordial leviathan became known, over time, as Tlaltecuhtli, 'ruler of the earth' according to several post-conquest manuscripts that survey Mexica mythology and belief systems, such as the Histoyre du méchique, Florentine Codex, and Codex Bodley, both compiled in the sixteenth century.

== Representations in art ==
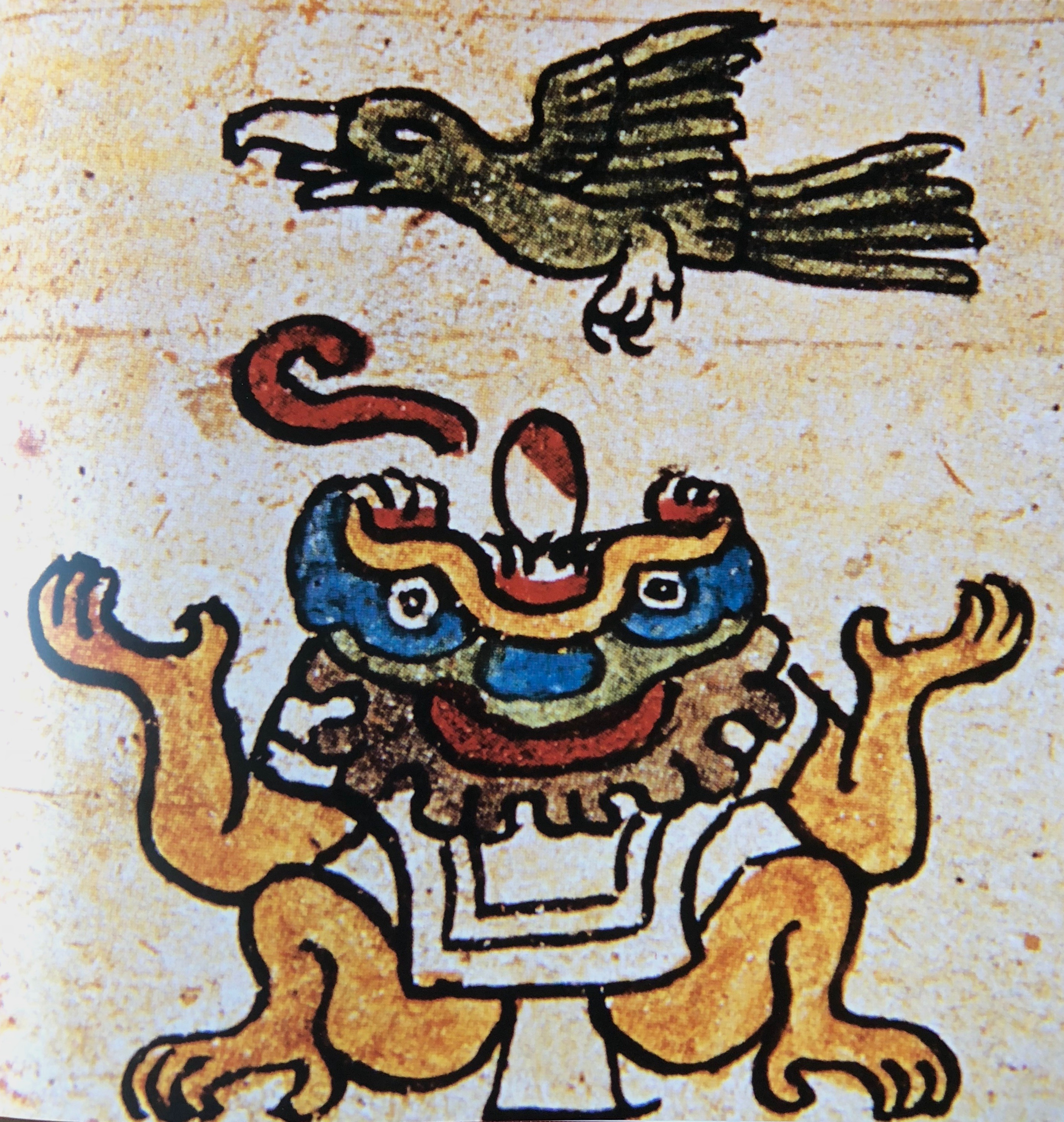
Depiction of Tlaltecuhtli in the Codex Borbonicus (ca. 1520), shown with a flint knife between her teeth

Tlaltecuhtli is typically depicted as a squatting toad-like creature with massive claws, a gaping mouth, and crocodile skin, which represented the surface of the earth. In carvings, her mouth is often shown with a river of blood flowing from it or a flint knife between her teeth, a reference to the human blood she thirsted for. Her elbows and knees are often adorned with human skulls, and she sometimes appears with multiple mouths full of sharp teeth all over her body. In some images, she wears a skirt made of human bones and a star border, a symbol of her primordial sacrifice.

Many sculptures of Tlaltecuhtli were meant only for the gods and were not intended to be seen by humans. She was often carved onto the bottom of sculptures where they made contact with the earth, or on the undersides of stone boxes called cuauhxicalli ("eagle box"), which held the sacrificial hearts she was so partial to. In reference to her mythological function as the support of the earth, Tlaltecuhtli was sometimes carved onto the cornerstones of temples, such as the pyramid platform at El Tajin.

Tlaltecuhtli's importance in the Mexica pantheon is demonstrated by her inclusion in major works of art. A representation of the goddess can be found on each side of the 1503 CE Coronation Stone of the Aztec ruler Moctezuma II, alongside the glyphs for fire and water — traditional symbols of war. Historian Mary Miller even suggests that Tlaltecuhtli may be the face in the center of the famous Aztec Calendar Stone (Piedra del Sol), where she symbolizes the end of the 5th and final Aztec cosmos.

Tlaltecuhtli appears in the Aztec calendar as the 2nd of the 13 deity days, and her date glyph is 1 Rabbit.

== Creation narrative ==
According to Alfonso Caso, there were four earth gods — Tlaltecuhtli, Coatlicue, Cihuacoatl and Tlazolteotl.

In the Mexica creation story, Tlaltecuhtli is described as a sea monster (sometimes called Cipactli) who dwelled in the ocean after the fourth Great Flood. She was an embodiment of the chaos that raged before creation. One day, the gods Quetzalcoatl and Tezcatlipoca descended from the heavens in the form of serpents and found the monstrous Tlaltecuhtli (Cipactli) sitting on top of the ocean with giant fangs, crocodile skin, and gnashing teeth calling for flesh to feast on. The two gods decided that the fifth cosmos could not prosper with such a horrible creature roaming the world, and so they set out to destroy her. To attract her, Tezcatlipoca used his foot as bait, and Tlaltecuhtli ate it. In the fight that followed, Tezcatlipoca lost his foot and Tlaltecuhtli lost her lower jaw, taking away her ability to sink below the surface of the water. After a long struggle, Tezcatlipoca and Quetzalcoatl managed to rip her body in two — from the upper half came the sky, and from the lower came the earth. She remained alive, however, and demanded human blood as repayment for her sacrifice.

The other gods were angered to hear of Tlaltecuhtli's treatment and decreed that the various parts of her dismembered body would become the features of the new world. Her skin became grasses and small flowers, her hair the trees and herbs, her eyes the springs and wells, her nose the hills and valleys, her shoulders the mountains, and her mouth the caves and rivers.

According to a source, all the deities of the earth are female, except the advocation of Tezcatlipoca, which is Tepeyollotl, 'heart of the mountain', and Tlaltecuthli, 'lord earth', which the latter is formed by the center of the body of Cipactli, which is It owes its other name, Tlalticpaque, 'lord of the world'. Tlaltecuhtli meets Coatlicue as a consort as the devourer, and Coatlicue as the one who gives continuous birth to new beings, men and animals.

== Rites and rituals ==
Since Tlaltecuhtli's body was transformed into the geographical features, the Mexica attributed strange sounds from the earth as either the screams of Tlaltecuhtli in her dismembered agony, or her calls for human blood to feed her. As a source of life, it was thought necessary to appease Tlaltecuhtli with blood sacrifices, especially human hearts. The Aztecs believed that Tlaltecuhtli's insatiable appetite had to be satisfied or the goddess would cease her nourishment of the earth and crops would fail.

The Mexica believe Tlaltecuhtli to swallow the sun between her massive jaws at dusk, and regurgitate it the next morning at dawn. The fear that this cycle could be interrupted, like during solar eclipses, was often the cause of uneasiness and increased ritual sacrifice. Tlaltecuhtli's connection to the sun ensured that she was included in the prayers offered to Tezcatlipoca before Aztec military campaigns.

Finally, because of Tlaltecuhtli's association with fertility, midwives called on her aid during difficult births—when an "infant warrior" threatened to kill the mother during labor.

== Gender debate ==
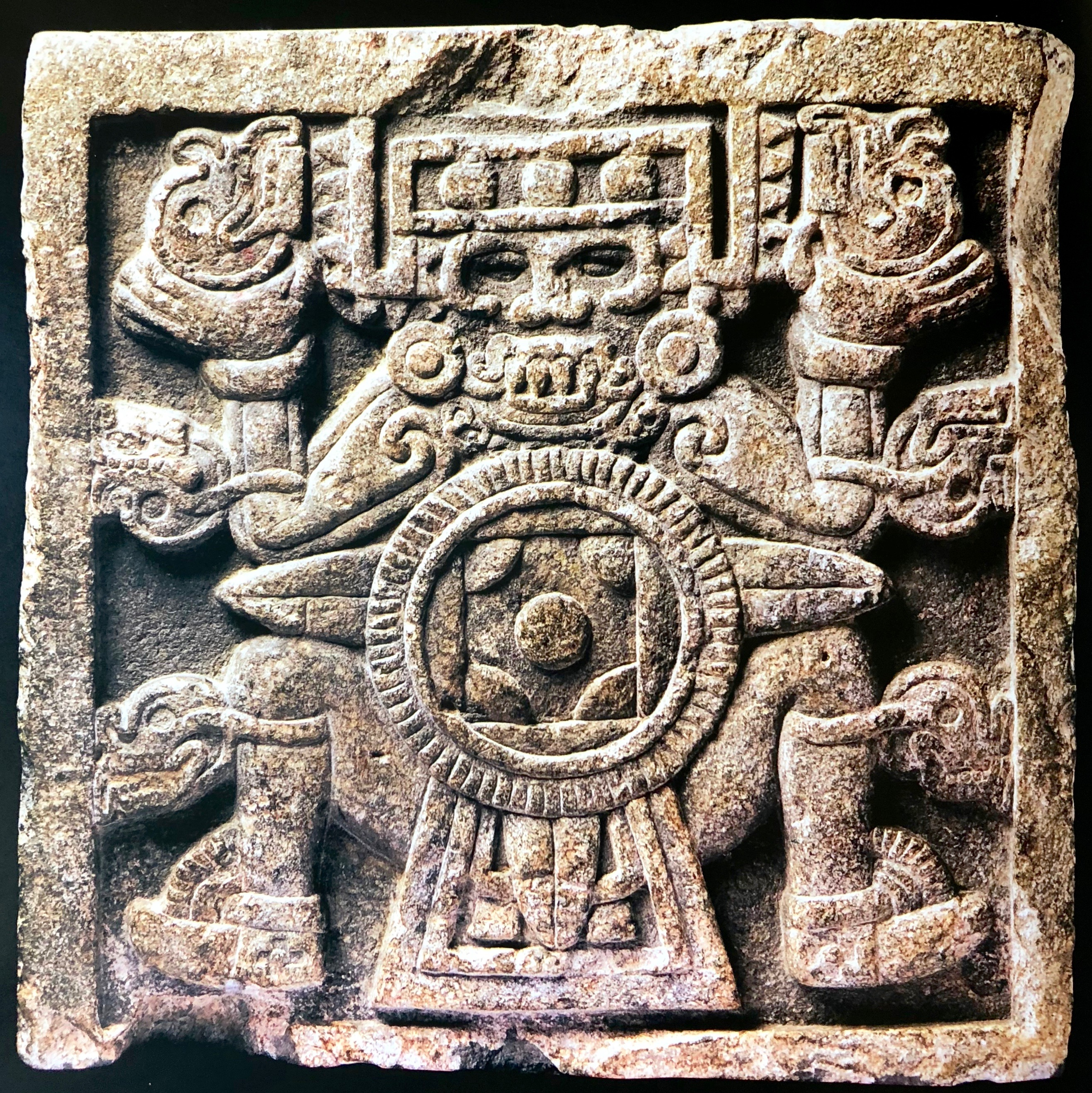
Masculine anthropomorphism of Tlaltecuhtli found in Tenochtitlan (ca. 1500), wearing a male maxtlatl loincloth and Tlaloc facemask

One of the largest modern debates surrounding Tlaltecuhtli is over the deity's gender. In English, "tlal-" translates to "earth," and "tecuhtli" is usually rendered "lord." However, "teuctli" (like most words in Nahuatl) has no gender, despite normally being used to describe men or male gods. There are notable exceptions—for example, the goddesses Ilamatecuhtli and Chalmecatecuhtli. In the Huehuetlahtolli collected by Horacio Carochi in the early 17th century (known as The Bancroft Dialogues), it is clear that "tēuctli" does not mean "lord" or "señor." Those are just approximations to the genderless Nahuatl title. A better rendering is "esteemed personage" or "noble." In fact, in The Bancroft Dialogues, older women are addressed as "notēcuiyo" or "my noble" several times.

While Tlaltecuhtli's name may be interpreted as masculine, the deity is most often depicted with female characteristics and clothing. According to Miller, "Tlaltecuhtli literally means 'Earth Lord,' but most Aztec representations clearly depict this creature as female, and despite the expected male gender of the name, some sources call Tlaltecuhtli a goddess. [She is] usually in a hocker, or birth-giving squat, with head flung backwards and her mouth of flint blades open."

Other scholars, like Alfonso Caso, interpret this pose as a male Tlaltecuhtli crouching under the earth with his mouth wide open, waiting to devour the dead. While Tlaltecuhtli is usually portrayed as female, some depictions are clearly male (though these distinctions may at times arise from the Spanish-language gendering process). H.B. Nicholson writes, "most of the available evidence suggests that... the earth monster in the mamazouhticac position was conceived to be female and depicted wearing the costume proper to that sex. A male aspect of that deity was also recognized and occasionally represented in appropriate garb—but was apparently quite subordinate to the more fundamental and pervasive female conception."

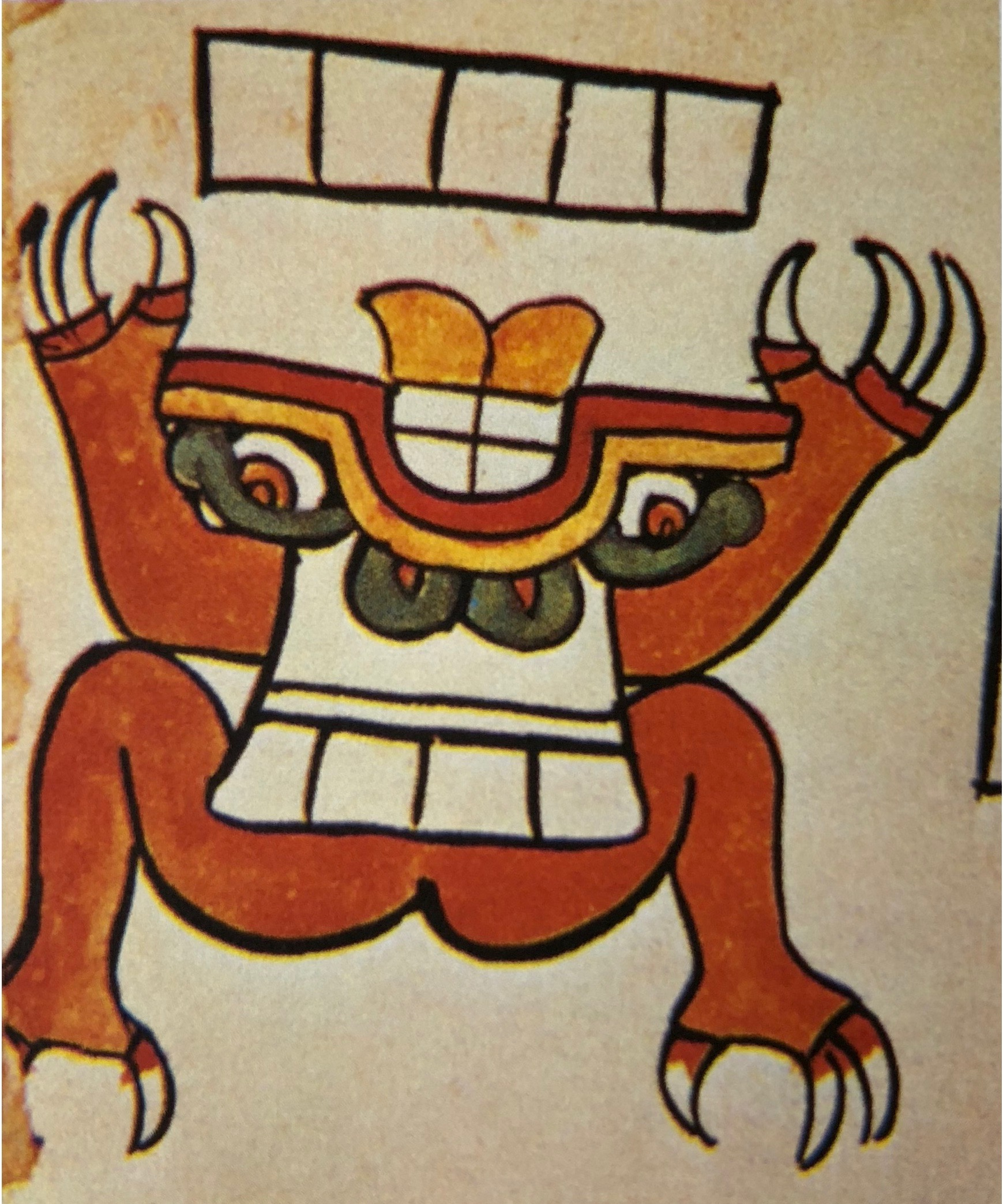
Feminine anthropomorphism of Tlaltecuhtli in the Codex Tudela (ca. 1540), wearing a women's huipil tunic

This ambiguity has prompted some scholars to argue that Tlaltecuhtli may have possessed a dual gender like several other Mesoamerican primordial deities. In Bernardino Sahagún's Florentine Codex, for example, Tlaltecuhtli is invoked as in tonan in tota —"our mother, our father"—and the deity is described as both a god and a goddess. Rather than signal hermaphroditism or androgyny, archaeologist Leonardo Lopez Lujan suggests that these varying embodiments are a testament to the deity's importance in the Mexica pantheon.

== Monolith ==
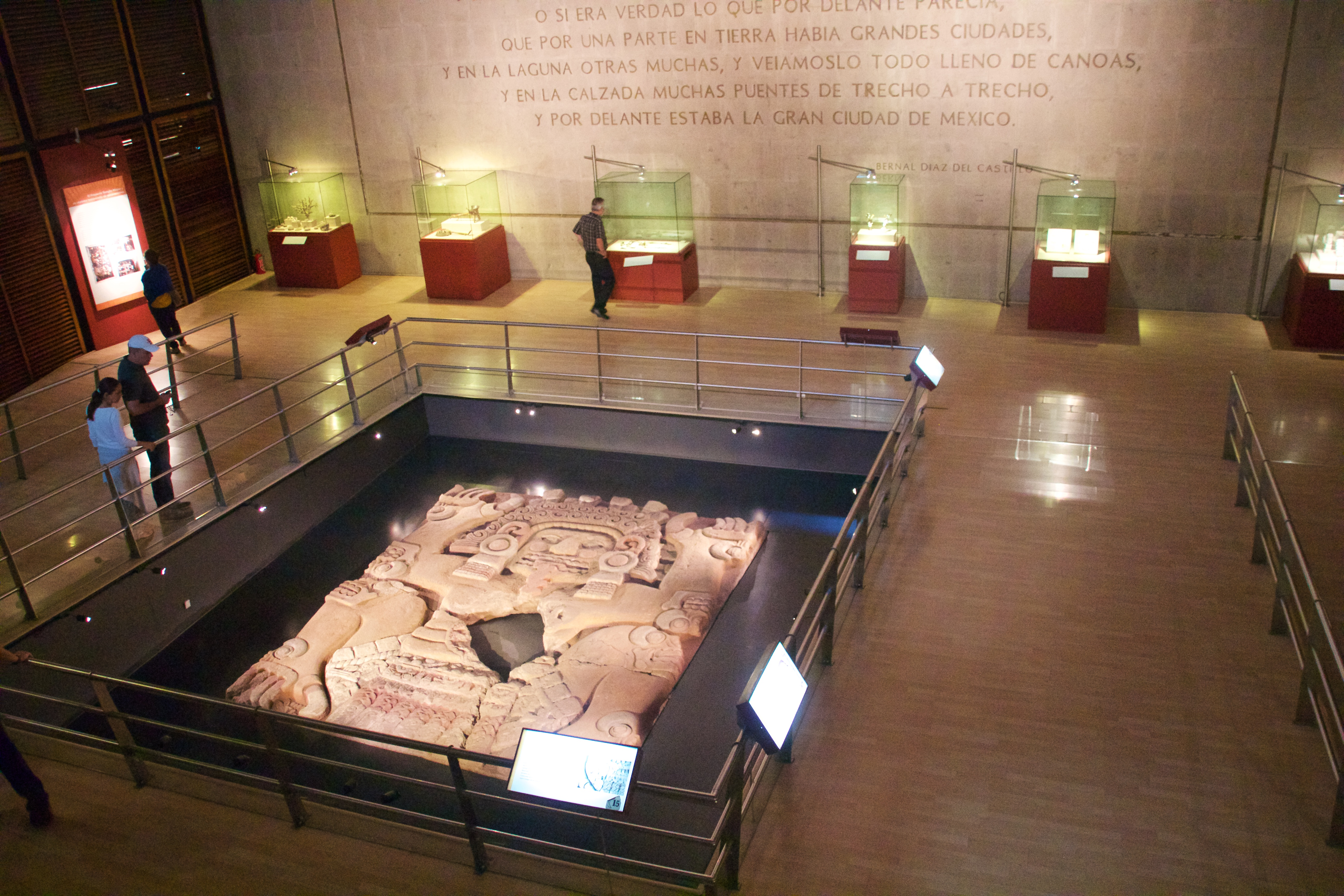
Tlaltecuhtli monolith on display in the Museum of the Templo Mayor

In 2006, a massive monolith of Tlaltecuhtli was discovered in an excavation at the Templo Mayor in Tenochtitlan (modern-day Mexico City). The sculpture measures approximately 13.1 x 11.8 feet (4 x 3.6 meters) and weighs nearly 12 tons, making it one of the largest Aztec monoliths ever discovered—larger even than the Calendar Stone. The sculpture, carved in a block of pink andesite, presents the goddess in her typical squatting position and is vividly painted in red, white, black, and blue. The stone was found by archaeologists broken into 4 pieces. Reassembled, Tlaltecuhtli's skull and bones skirt, and the river of blood flowing from her mouth, can be seen.

Though most renderings of Tlaltecuhtli were placed face down, this monolith was found face up. Clutched in her lower right claw is the year glyph for 10 rabbit (1502 CE). Lopez Lujan noted that according to the surviving codices, 1502 was the year that one of the empire's most feared rulers, Ahuitzotl, was laid to rest. Just below this monument, Offering 126 was found, a huge dedicatory deposit containing 12 thousand objects.

After several years of excavation and restoration, the monolith can be seen on display at the Museum of the Templo Mayor in Mexico City.

== See also ==
- Cosmic Man
- Tiamat – similar figure in Mesopotamian mythology
- Ymir – similar figure in Norse mythology
- Pangu – similar figure in Chinese mythology
