= Cuauhxicalli =

Aztec stone ritual vessel

A cuauhxicalli or quauhxicalli (Nahuatl: [kʷaːʍʃiˈkalːi], meaning "eagle gourd bowl") was an altar-like stone vessel used by the Aztec in sacrificial ceremonies, believed to be for holding human hearts. A cuauhxicalli would often be decorated with animal motifs, commonly eagles or jaguars. Another kind of cuauhxicalli is the Chacmool-type, which is shaped as a reclining person holding a bowl on his belly.

== Gallery ==
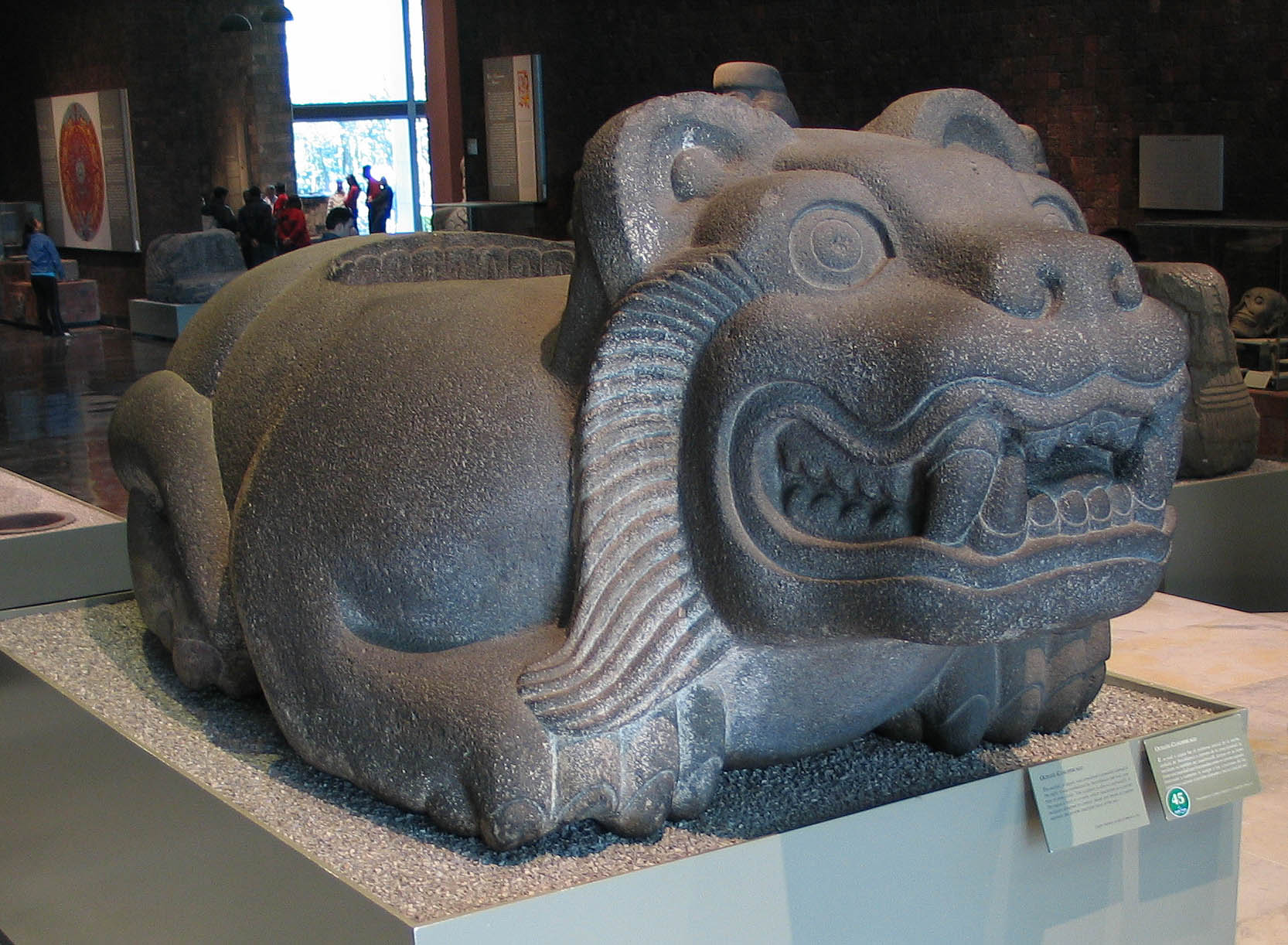
Jaguar-shaped cuauhxicalli in the National Museum of Anthropology of Mexico

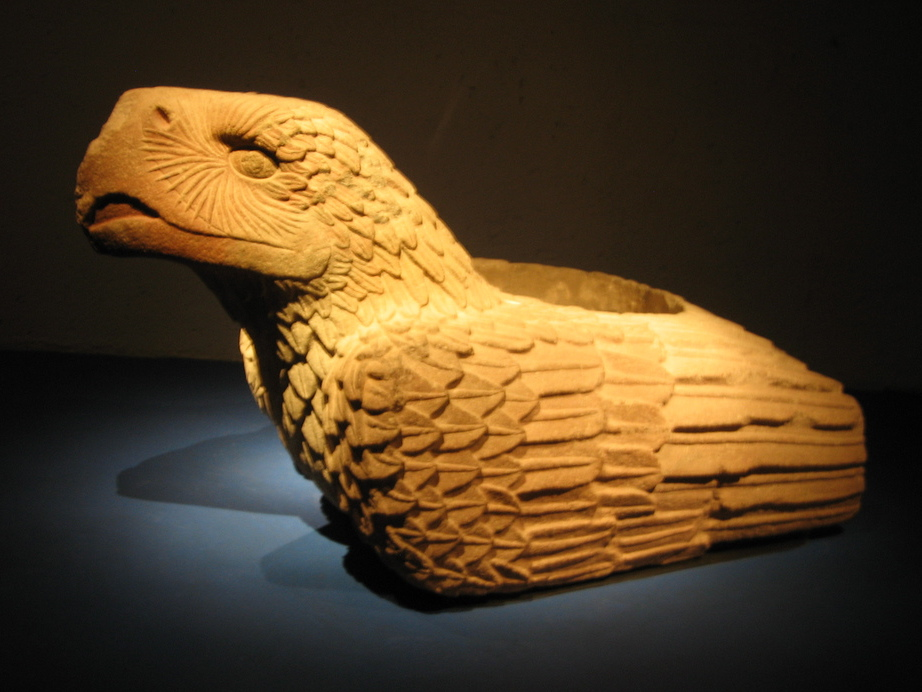
Cuauhxicalli in the shape of an eagle, from the Templo Mayor

Video of a cuauhxicalli, National Museum of Anthropology of Mexico

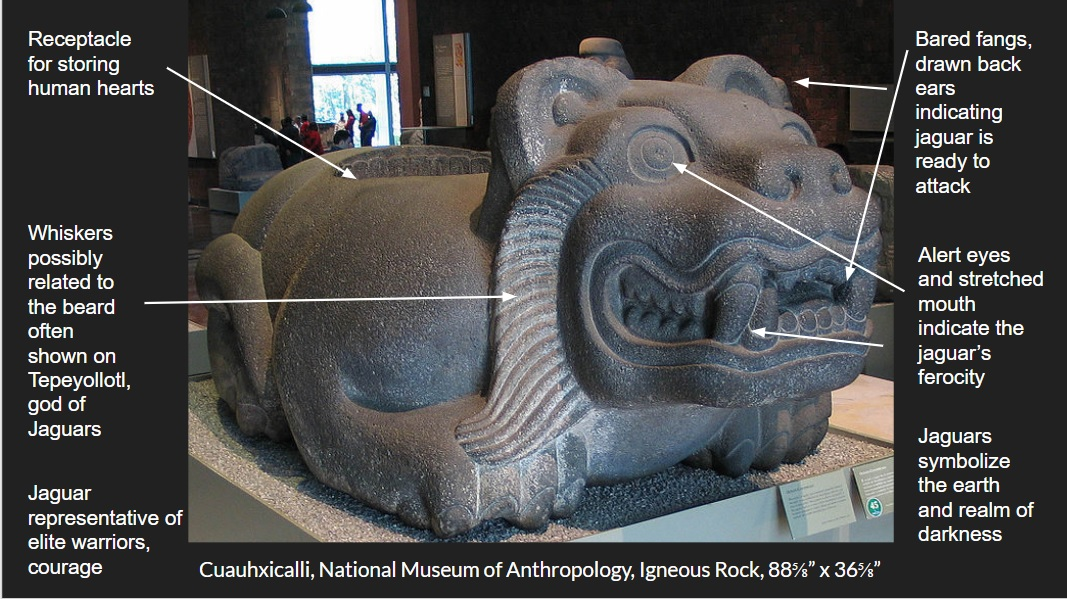
Annotated image of a Cuauhxicalli sculpture
