= List of Victor and Valentino characters =

The American animated television series Victor and Valentino features a cast created by Diego Molano. The series focuses on half brothers Victor (voiced by Molano) and Valentino (voiced by Sean-Ryan Petersen) who navigate the town of Monte Macabre in search of adventure and get caught in a series of bizarre encounters. They live with their grandmother Chata (voiced by Laura Patalano) while occasionally many of the other residents get involved for one reason or another.

== Main ==
=== Victor ===
Victor
- Victor and Valentino character
- This file has an invalid non-free use claim and may be deleted after Sunday, 22 November 2026.
- First appearance: "Victor and Valentino" (pilot) "Folk Art Foes" (actual)
- Created by: Diego Molano
- Voiced by: Diego Molano; Eric Bradley (Whistling)
- Age: 10

In-universe information
- Full name: Victor Guadalupe Morena Laguna Calaca Calavera
- Nickname: Vic
- Species: Human
- Gender: Male
- Family: Valentino (half-brother); Chata (grandmother)

Victor Guadalupe Morena Laguna Calaca Calavera is a 10-year-old half-brother who is the younger of the two. He wears a blue poncho over a white shirt and has a noticeable gap between his teeth. He is impulsive, feisty, arrogant, and obnoxious when it comes to taking part in adventures. He would rather slack off and not do anything instead of work, but if possible, he tries to look for an easy way out of doing things. This would often lead to him finding some supernatural object or getting dragged in a paranormal adventure. He is shown to be a very active kid that just wants to have fun while also taking advantage of certain things. Between him and Val, he is the one that typically learns his lesson the most. Deep down, he is afraid of confronting his own flaws and usually needs some coaxing from those around him to acknowledge and accept them. He is also constantly making malapropisms such as referring to himself as "Victor the Contagious" when he really means "Courageous". This also extends to his writing, where he is shown to be slightly illiterate. He is capable of whistling, but only when Val tickles him, though later he masters it on his own.

Despite his flaws, Victor has a very strong connection with his family. While he and Val argue over their differences often, he does care for his well-being and has come to his rescue every now and then, though not as often as the other way around. Vic has wished a couple of times that he were an only child, only to realize that he would rather have Val around as he is the only one who understands him. He also cares a great deal for his grandma Chata and tries to get her out of harm's way. He has, on occasion, taken advantage of her, though he does not mean any real harm to her and still loves her a great deal. Outside of his family, he is close friends with Miguelito, possibly because of their similar interests. Besides him, Vic's relationship with the other kids shifts between mutual to sometimes antagonistic. When things are not too crazy, he does tend to get along with the other children. The only other adult he interacts with is Don Jalapeño, who he makes fun of.

By the series finale, it is implied that he and Valentino (among other characters) are demigods, but this was only meant as a precursor to the next season, in which "Victor, Valentino and the whole town would have woken up to their god-hood" (emphasis in original), and which would have also seen him and his brother "comedically struggle to harness their grandfather Tlaloc's special powers of lighting and rain", according to series creator Diego Molano.

=== Valentino ===
Valentino
- Victor and Valentino character
- This file has an invalid non-free use claim and may be deleted after Sunday, 22 November 2026.
- First appearance: "Victor and Valentino" (pilot) "Folk Art Foes" (actual)
- Created by: Diego Molano
- Voiced by: Rico Rodriguez (Pilot); Sean-Ryan Petersen (Series)
- Age: 12

In-universe information
- Full name: Valentino Calavera
- Nickname: Val
- Species: Human
- Gender: Male
- Family: Victor (half-brother); Chata (grandmother)

Valentino Calavera is a 12-year-old half-brother who is the older of the two. He is slightly taller than Vic and is somewhat rotund in appearance. He wears a red-orange poncho that covers his entire top half. He is calm, well-disciplined, kind and tends to be the more responsible of the two. While he occasionally is the reason for some of the supernatural occurrences, more often than not, he gets dragged into adventures by Vic. Despite being slightly overweight, he is shown to be physical when he needs to be. He collects things as a hobby and has a habit of trying to keep things clean and organized, implying that he might have OCD. He can be overly confident and sometimes displays a superiority complex, but will become humbled after each strange encounter and will realize when he has gone too far. Val tends to be the more emotional of the brothers and is quick to fall in love or display an attraction towards girls. He is also more artistic than Vic and more appreciative of the simpler and older things in life. He claims to have a good repertoire with elders, calling himself the "Boomer-ang". Val is more mature than Vic, but he just wants to have the same enjoyment most kids have.

Val cares deeply for his family, despite the issues he might have. While Vic picks on his soft nature, he gets back at him by poking fun at his uncoordinated behavior. He sometimes wishes he were an only child, but at the end of the day, finds himself rescuing his younger brother from the dangers they bring upon themselves. He also adores his grandma Chata and does everything he can to appease her while also trying to refrain from disappointing her in any way. Unlike Vic, Val gets along well with the other kids in Monte Macabre. He mostly hangs out with Isabella, Rosita, Cacao, Guillermo, Reynaldo and Reynalda, all of whom share most of his interests and take part in the various activities that he sets up. He takes his rivalry with Charlene and Pineapple very seriously to the point that he considers it desperate when he chooses to hang out with them. Early in the series, he has crush on Isabella due to her intellect, which he was initially jealous of, and has started trying to be closer to her, eventually becoming a couple in "The Matchmaker". However, the relationship ends in "Starry Eyes" when she turns out to be a Mega-mime. He is much more respectful to Don Jalapeño, but just like his brother, he will mock and prank him just to see him get angry.

By the series finale, it is implied that he and Victor are demigods (see above).

=== Grandma Chata ===
Grandma Chata
- Victor and Valentino character
- First appearance: "Victor and Valentino" (pilot) "Folk Art Foes" (actual)
- Created by: Diego Molano
- Voiced by: Carla Tassara (Pilot); Laura Patalano (Series)
- Age: 75

In-universe information
- Species: Goddess
- Gender: Female
- Family: Victor (grandson); Valentino (grandson)

Grandma Chata is Victor and Valentino's partially blind grandmother. She wears a traditional native white dress and has big glasses, despite still not being able to see, and carries a walking cane with her at all times. She is soft-spoken, wise, and keeps the boys in check. She appears to be aware of the things the brothers do around her which she refers to as her "abuela senses". However, Chata can be very fierce and harsh at times. Whenever the boys act out of line, Chata will remind them that she is in charge which is comically shown with her opening her eyes and producing fangs in intense anger. She is also shown to be very competitive and aggressive, such as when she wasted no time going to the movies without Vic and Val. She is also shown to be slightly conceited, claiming herself to be beautiful and also having a Quinceañera every fifteen years just to appease herself. Despite all this, she is shown to be a very caring grandmother who prepares for the well-being of her grandsons. The pilot presented her as a spirit that can take human form, while the show only implies her supernatural connections.

Chata loves her grandsons equally, though she has shown to favor Val's decisions over Vic as even she sees that Val has more restraint than him. She can be unusually harsh with them, but this is usually so that she can teach them a lesson. Chata mostly interacts with Don Jalapeño, whom she affectionately calls Julio. She usually ends up "dating" him whenever they go out. While it is clear that Don Jalapeño has a crush on her, it is unknown if it is requited or if she is just being polite with him. Chata despises Maria Teresa, whom she views as her rival and does everything she can to top her. Chata appears to get along well with many of the residents and hardly shows any prejudice. She has convinced Vic and Val to attend Guillermo's party despite his odd behavior and let Sal stay with them even though he was an unruly house guest. Overall, she tends to expect the best out of everyone, except for Maria Teresa.

The series finale "Fall of the Fifth Sun" reveals that Chata is actually the goddess Chalchiuhtlicue. Prior to the series' events, Chalchiuhtlicue was cursed by Tez, making her become human and lose her memories. However, she was restored to normal after Tez removed all the curses he placed on Monte Macabre.

== Supporting ==
=== Charlene ===
Charlene (voiced by Cristina Milizia) is a strange little girl who lives in Monte Macabre. She is adorned in black, resembling a goth doll, has a large gap between her teeth and unusually large eyeballs that extend past her face. Charlene is a very dark and macabre girl who always displays a happy disposition. She hangs out with her brother Pineapple and are considered Victor and Valentino's rivals. She openly mocks the two yet is shown to hang out and play with them on occasion. Charlene also has an open crush on Vic as she was quick to take part in things he is involved in and blushed heavily when he asked to go to her place and when he called her creepy, which she considers a compliment. She also keeps a personal doll that looks like him. While openly aware of Vic's hatred for her, it does not stop her from trying to be with him. In the crossover episode with Villainous, Charlene mistook Demencia for being in love with Vic and began to harass her. In "Charlene Mania," she concluded that Victor's hatred made him immune to a love perfume. However, it implies that hatred would bear no effect on the perfume.

Charlene has connections to the supernatural which she likes to use on the brothers. She also has a strong fondness for meeting supernatural entities and in one case asked La Llorona to adopt her. It is not known what her own personal goals are in relation to her grandfather Tez. While she is unquestionably compliant with his demands, to an almost uncomfortable level, she is still willing to stick her neck out to Vic and Val, with a catch that is.

=== Pineapple ===
Pineapple (voiced by Diego Molano) is a large lumbering monosyllabic boy and brother to Charlene. He is bigger than most of the kids in Monte Macabre and has a mohawk. He tends to act as more of a bodyguard or a servant to Charlene and only makes groaning noises and other sounds when necessary. On the side, he takes dance classes and is an expert in wrestling due to his immense size. He also owns a cat café. In "Lonely Haunts Club 3: La Llorona", it is revealed that all he can say are the words "Pine" and "Apple".

=== Maria Teresa ===
Maria Teresa (voiced by Frankie Quiñones) is Charlene and Pineapple's grandmother. Much like how her grandchildren oppose Victor and Valentino, Maria Teresa opposes Grandma Chata and it is implied that the two have had a long heated rivalry throughout most of their lives. Maria Teresa tries to retain her looks and possesses shoulder length black hair, big gaudy glasses and a tight pink dress that mesh with her skinny, grey appearance. She is mean spirited and likes to use her own magical relics for her own selfish uses. She sometimes treats Charlene and Pineapple like her own servants, but other times it is shown that she genuinely cares for them and vice versa. She has allowed them to lay around her extravagant home as she considers them delicate.

=== Don Jalapeño ===
Don Julio Jalapeño (voiced by Jason Hightower) is the owner of the mini-mart in Monte Macabre. He is an overweight man with a big mustache, a red vest and small sombrero. He is always tense about something, especially when it comes to Victor and Valentino who are always the center of strange happenings in town. He keeps a codex full of information on Mexican and Mesoamerican culture and cryptids which he allows the boys to use. He also keeps extensive files of all the inhabitants of Monte Macabre which he refuses to share with anyone. He has a huge crush on Chata, and gets nervous and sweaty around her. He sometimes stress eats while he is talking. It is implied that he was once a troublemaker and through a series of his own misadventures as a youth, grew up and became the stifled, rule abiding citizen that he is today. Don is also very gullible and thinks that Tez is an incredible leader; becoming his chief of surveillance so that he can keep an eye on Vic and Val.

=== Xochi Jalapeño ===
Xochi Jalapeño
- Victor and Valentino character
- First appearance: "Folk Art Foes"
- Last appearance: "Fall of the Fifth Sun"
- Created by: Diego Molano
- Voiced by: Cristina Vee
- Age: 17

In-universe information
- Species: Human
- Gender: Female
- Family: Don Jalapeño (father)

Xochi Jalapeño (voiced by Cristina Vee) is the teenage daughter of Don Jalapeño. She is a typical, moody teen who does not care much about the going-ons around her. She tends to the mystical plants in the back of her father's store and in "Xochi's Garden", it is revealed that she has chlorokinesis, the magical ability to manipulate plants, and Xochi also mentions that her mother died while Xochi was very young; however, the show was cancelled before either of these could fully be explored. Despite having a slightly intense relationship with Victor and Valentino, she respects them because she likes seeing them making her father angry. She in some ways acts like an older sister around them and sometimes offers good advice to them. Xochi has a personal life that she does not talk about often. She takes salsa classes and is physically fit as she is able to perform complicated acrobatic maneuvers. Xochi also performs in a band. She enjoys spending time with her girlfriend Amabel.

=== Sal ===
Sal (voiced by Jorge Gutiérrez) is a free spirited man who is friends with Vic and Val and owns a magic shell flute that takes him anywhere. He acts very aloof, acting nonchalant over supernatural events and being ignorant to various social norms. He apparently goes on various adventures when not hanging around Vic and Val and has had an interspecies relationship with a queen ant once. He is also revealed to be the Butterman, an enigmatic defender of butterflies whose actions caused him to be exiled from Monte Macabre. The episode "Follow the North Star" reveals that Sal is Quetzalcoatl and Tez's brother. Prior to the series' events, Tez cursed Quetzalcoatl, making him human and removing his memories. Sal is restored to normal after being given sacred water from Chata's water vessel.

=== Isabella ===
Isabella (voiced by Cristina Milizia) is a kind, fairly laid-back 11-year-old girl who is supportive of Val and hangs out with him and Vic occasionally. She is a fast puzzle solver with deductions skills that succeed Val's and is shown to have a crush on him. She has slowly started to become close and is usually sympathetic to Val, and to a certain extent Vic. Even when Val acts out of line, she will usually remain very calm and patient with him and try to talk him out of making a bad decision. Ultimately, she and Val start dating in "The Matchmaker". "Starry Eyes" reveals that she is Ītzpāpālōtl, a variant of Tzitzimime called a Mega-mime who is in league with Tez. In the series finale, "Fall of the Fifth Sun", she was killed by Tez and became a star.

=== Tez ===
Tez (voiced by Christian Lanz) is an all powerful magician and Maria Teresa's husband who serves as a major antagonist in the series, using parlor tricks to conceal his incredibly powerful magic and has sinister plans for Monte Macabre. He has a mirror as a prosthetic foot: he originally claims his foot was bitten off by a crocodile named Guapo, but then suggests it was actually bitten off by a "winged serpent". He has it in for the boys due to them constantly outwitting him. In the episode "Sal's Our Pal", he becomes Monte Macabre's Huey Tlatoani and begins to slowly take over the town. He is later revealed to be the god Tezcatlipoca and Sal's brother, defeated by Sal in the series finale after regaining his memories as Quetzalcoatl. Victor and Valentino convinced Tez to redeem himself, resulting in him removing all the curses he had placed on the people of Monte Macabre while restoring his fellow gods' memories. Tez was taken by the Tzitimimes and imprisoned in their realm for disappointing their leader, Coyolxauhqui; however, the series was cancelled before the consequences of Tez's actions could be fully explored.

== Recurring ==
=== Monte Macabre ===
- Huitzi (voiced by Cristina Milizia) is a feisty hummingbird who is Chata's pet. He punishes Vic and Val by pecking them in their behinds. The episode "Fall of the Fifth Sun" reveals that he was originally the god Huītzilōpōchtli before being cursed and turned into a hummingbird by Tez. He was restored to normal after Tez removed all the curses he placed on Monte Macabre.
- Cammy (voiced by Dee Bradley Baker) is a baby Camazotz that Vic adopts as a pet. Val initially disliked him, but began to love him after he saves their lives. He has a rivalry with Huitzi.
- Guillermo (voiced by Tom Kenny) is a short, pale, white-haired boy who speaks in a guttural low voice. Despite his creepy and unusual appearance, he is friendly. He has a habit of facing the opposite direction of whoever is talking to him. He is physically based on artist H. R. Giger and his house references his work. He has a "girlfriend" named Ripley, named after Ellen Ripley, who is an artistic construct of his own design.
- Alma Creator (voiced by Erica Luttrell) is Guillermo's mother who despite her son's odd behavior, acts like a typical doting mother who appeases his bizarre fascinations. Besides Vic, Val and Chata, she is the only other person who believes that Tez is evil.
- Co-Creator (voiced by Jorge Gutierrez) is Guillermo's dad who is friendly and appeases his son's surreal qualities. He is physically based on Guillermo del Toro.
- Cacao (voiced by Debi Derryberry) is a small infant boy who really loves chocolate and sells it for money. He only seems capable of shouting "Cacao!" In "Escape from Bebe Bay", he speaks full sentences, from a baby's perspective, and talks in heavy urban slang, (voiced by Carl Jones). It is revealed in "Villainy In Monte Macabre", that Cacao is actually a mutant squid from the Villainous dimension who tried to stop the plans from Black Hat's "long time client" but was captured by Dr. Flug and Demencia assisted by Victor and Valentino, who thought he was evil. However, the canonicity of the episode can be called into question, as Cacao reappears with no explanation as to how he returned and no mention of the events of the episode.
- Rosa "Rosita" (voiced by Arianna Villavicencio) is a young and studious girl who views everything as a chance to learn, but gets distracted easily. She shares her love of insects with Miguelito and start dating in "The Matchmaker".
- Miguelito (voiced by Spencer Rothbell in season 1 and 2, Carlos Alazraqui in Season 3) is a friend of Vic's who acts as his sidekick of sorts. In later episodes, he becomes more independent and is shown to be very responsible as he has numerous younger siblings who look like him. He shares his interests in bugs with Rosita and start dating in "The Matchmaker".
  - Manuelito (voiced by Ryan Lopez) is one of Miguelito's younger siblings. He looks up to him.
- Lupe Gonzalez (voiced by Jenny Lorenzo) is the local baker who is short tempered and speaks with a thick Cuban accent similar to Tony Montana. She has a crush on Ramon. She dislikes Victor after "La Planchada" and never wanted to see him in her bakery ever again.
- Abuela Gonzalez (voiced by Jenny Lorenzo) is Lupe's toughened grandmother who owns the bakery. She speaks in unintelligible Spanish and is blind in one eye.
- Ramon (voiced by Oscar Montoya) is a cool guy that all the kids like. He has a habit of telling an exciting story, only to reveal that it was really mundane. He is very relaxed, even when people are being rude to him.
- Gustavo (voiced by Eric Lopez) is a crazy young man in Monte Macabre who is always doing outlandish things.
- Reynaldo (voiced by Diego Molano) is a dorky plump boy with silver braces who is affectionate with his twin sister Reynalda.
- Reynalda (voiced by Cristina Milizia) is a dorky plump girl with red, green, and blue braces who is affectionate with her twin brother Reynaldo.
- Reyna (voiced by Nathalia Hencker) is Reynaldo and Reynalda's mother who looks just like her children and has a similar personality.
- Rey (voiced by Francisco Ramos) is Reynaldo and Reynalda's father who, contrary to the family, is very handsome, incredibly fit, and possesses immense strength. He does wear braces.
- Fernando (voiced by Max Mittelman) is a nervous young teenager who wants to look cool and does not realize that others make fun of him.
- Andres (voiced by Xolo Maridueña) is a cool skateboarding teen whom Vic and Val idolize.
- Baker (voiced by Yuri Lowenthal) is an obnoxious boy who values photography in a superficial way.
- Amabel (voiced by Alex Cazares) is Xochi's confidant and crass girlfriend. She is very cool and forgiving of Xochi and enjoys spending time with her.
- Tula (voiced by Montse Hernandez) is a rich, snobby girl, whose father owns a well-established company. She looks down on Vic and Val and finds them crass and uncouth.
- Tula's Mom (voiced by Carolina Ravassa): She seems to have passed much of her behavior to her daughter, though she is slightly more polite about it.
- Trader Josephino (voiced by Spencer Rothbell) is the scheming owner of Tio Walt's who seems to be hiding from something.
- The Cupcake Man (voiced by Danny Trejo) is a large intimidating former gang member who has since dedicated his life to baking cupcakes and setting the youth straight.
- Old Man Teo (voiced by Keith Ferguson) is a grumpy old elder who resides at Dusty Meadows Senior Center. He is actually Xiuhtecuhtli, whose headpiece was taken from him and he teams up with Valentino, the only one who understands him, to reclaim his glory.
- Ondina (voiced by Carolina Ravassa) is a woman who studies heron migration to keep the piranhas in check. She built a large heron-shaped plane to fend off a giant piranha.
- Carla Maria Jimenez (voiced by Carolina Ravassa) is the local auto repair mechanic who takes her job very seriously.
- La Pulga (voiced by Carlos Alazraqui) is a legendary daredevil who Vic and Miguelito look up to. He apparently lost his hand in some kind of stunt.

=== Elsewhere ===
- Guadelupe (voiced by Maria Bamford) is an eccentric and spiritual woman who lives in the mountains and offers useful, albeit crazy-sounding, advice.
- Javier (voiced by Dante Basco) is the unfair former leader of the hidden skate park who wears a headdress resembling a bat. He returns in "Los Perdidos" where he is revealed to be the titular creature who tries to convert others.
- Itzel (voiced by Carolina Ravassa) is a kind girl living at the hidden skate park who wears a headdress resembling an eagle.
- Juan Lindo (voiced by Rafael Sigler) is a famous singer with a very flamboyant appearance. He is based on Juan Gabriel.
- Waldo Pescado (voiced by Francisco Ramos) is a famous fortune teller who is actually a phony who swindles people. He is based on Walter Mercado.
- Queenie (voiced by Carolina Ravassa) is a queen ant and the keeper of the corn that Sal needs to sell. They are apparently former lovers.
- Rey Mysterio (voiced by himself) is a famous luchador who in the show's universe is the grandson of the original Rey Mysterio, Rey Mysterio Sr.
- El Bigote (voiced by Felipe Esparza) is an old, mean-spirited luchador who tried to take advantage of Vic by having him do his chores.

=== Supernatural ===
- The Bone Boys, Mic and Hun (both voiced by Daran Norris) are two brothers who are the keepers of the Realm of the Dead. Mic talks while Hun is usually silent. They can combine into a singular entity called Mictlāntēcutli, who is voiced by Fred Tatasciore. In "Through the Nine Realms of Mictlan", the Bone Boys put Vic, Val and Cristina through all the realms to get to the end. After they succeed, they allow the boys to come and visit the ninth realm as they find their personalities and adventures amusing.
- Achi (voiced by Christian Lanz) is the Bone Boys' undead chihuahua-like minion that likes Valentino's tacos because "they're awful".
- Huehue (voiced by Christian Lanz) is an evil coyote trickster spirit who was imprisoned in an Alebrije. He is a stickler for proper spelling. At the end of "Folk Art Friends", he escapes his imprisonment and flees Monte Macabre.
- Botero (voiced by Fred Tatasciore) is the alebrije spirit of gluttony that takes the form of a blue caiman. He eats non-stop and increases in size.
- Miguel (voiced by Dee Bradley Baker) is a green, monkey-like alebrije spirit of music. He is obsessed with compositions and transforms people into instruments.
- Rick and Richard (both voiced by Eric Bauza) are the alebrije spirit of humor that takes the form of a two-headed flamingo. They speak like comedians and force people to laugh.
- El Pintor (voiced by Tony Plana) is a ghost painter who lost the love of his life and is forced to haunt an isolated mansion. He quickly befriends Vic, Val, Charlene, and Pineapple.
- El Colorado (voiced by Kevin Michael Richardson) is a character from the game "Suerte". He resembles a red devil with a bird-like left foot.
- Chupacabra "Chupa" (voiced by Fred Tatasciore) is the actual cryptid of Mexican folklore who, contrary to most depictions, is a kind creature who loves animals and is a vegetarian. He just does not like being photographed.
- Lechuza (voiced by Vanessa Marshall) is an owl-woman of Mexican folklore who kidnaps children who cry too loudly. She dotes on her "children" and pampers them excessively, turning them into lazy, baby-like adults.
- Chip (voiced by James Arnold Taylor) is a creepy man who owns a collection store that holds items and people's souls. He resembles a porcelain doll or a ventriloquist dummy.
- El Toro (voiced by Jorge Gutierrez) is an undead masked wrestler residing in the underworld; he is Vic and Val's great-uncle.
- Matty (voiced by Olivia Trujillo) is a girl who is actually a Matlazihua, who looks like a female Val and woos him in an attempt to eat him.
- Hairy Mary (voiced by Cristina Milizia) is a ghost girl who was obsessed with dolls to the point that she never cut her hair and it got big and frizzy. She made the perfect doll composed of parts from her other ones called Annie and considers it her most precious possession.
- El Silbon (voiced by Eric Bradley) is a whistling demonic spirit who has the ability to remove the bones from a person's body which he then collects for his own nefarious purposes. He resembles Jack Skellington from The Nightmare Before Christmas.
- Nagual (voiced by Dee Bradley Baker) is a goat who has the ability to change into an old man. He transforms Vic and Val into animals to teach them a lesson.
- Alfonso (voiced by John DiMaggio) and Moreno (voiced by Lowenthal) are a pair of famous baseball players who lost a game and died unexpectedly. They blamed each other for the loss, unaware that it would have been impossible for them to avoid.
- Paco (voiced by Danny Trejo) is the long dead leader of the Lords of Ghost Town who had lost the love of his life Jenny. He attempted to wreak havoc on Monte Macabre, but Victor, Valentino, and Achi promised to reunite him with his lost love, Jenny. In "Through the Nine Realms of Mictlan", he and his crew make it to the final realm, where he is reunited with Jenny.
- Larry Ladron (voiced by Kevin Michael Richardson) is a carnival owner who resembles a flea. He eats live crickets and runs an oddities exhibit that is actually composed of people that he transformed into freaks.
- Dolores Del Rey (voiced by Renée Victor) is a deceased actress who tried to drain the youth from Valentino so that she can reclaim her glory. In "Through the Nine Realms of Mictlan", she has apparently become repentant of her actions and finally makes it to the ninth realm where she is adored by her fellow deceased fans.
- Lana (voiced by Haley Mancini) is an mermaid that Vic befriends. She tries training him to swim, but instead becomes obsessed with finding the perfect legs for herself using a magic pearl. She learns the error of her ways and returns everything to normal by destroying it. The town is afraid of her, but she does not care.
- Tzitzimime (voiced by Dee Bradley Baker) are a race of extraterrestrials who are pitch black with starlight texture. They have the ability to possess humans and they want to know everything about Chata.
- La Llorona (voiced by Vanessa Marshall) is the ghostly woman of legend who takes children. It is revealed that she suffers from severe empty nest syndrome and her constant weeping is because she is lonely. Val immediately befriends her and she agrees to allow her house to be the Lonely Haunts Club base so she'll have company.
- Xipe (voiced by Miggs Perez) is the owner of a thrift store. He has the ability to alter any fabric or object into any clothing including human skin. Despite this, he is a very friendly and slightly effeminate person who teaches Val to accept himself for who he is.
- Cristina (voiced by Montse Hernandez) is a ghost girl who appears to be close in age to Vic. The two immediately become friends due to their shared interests in pranking people. In "Through the Nine Realms of Mictlan", Cristina is tricked by Vic into staying in Monte Macabre and goes on a journey with him and Val to get to the ninth realm. She later forgives him and is reunited with her family.
- Baby Pepito (voiced by Dee Bradley Baker) is a Chaneque resembling a small baby. He is terrifying and preyed on Chata due to her innocence.
- La Planchada (voiced by Jenny Lorenzo) is a ghostly nurse who appears in a two-dimensional state and is summoned to cure the sick. She teaches Vic a lesson in taking responsibility for spreading chicken pox and is capable of flattening the living.
- Xochi Pilli (voiced by Arnie Pantoja) is a king of Patoli who comes from another world and challenges Val to the game.
- José Guadalupe Posada (voiced by George Lopez) is the real-life figure, now deceased, who takes his artwork very seriously and tries to teach Vic and Val a lesson.
- La Catrina (voiced by Susana Ballesteros) is a famous singer with a distinct voice. Another woman posed as her in the underworld while the real La Catrina quit and became a cab driver that travels to and from the land of the living.
- Ahuizotl (voiced by Dee Bradley Baker) is a ferocious dog creature with a hand for a tail who feeds on human fingernails and eyeballs.
- Coyolxāuhqui (voiced by Cristina Vee) is the leader of the Tzitzimime who made a deal with Tez to destroy the world, and is implied to be Isabella's mother. Due to the show's cancellation, the series finale "Fall of the Fifth Sun" would prove to be her only appearance. However, had the series been picked up for a fourth season, she would have become the primary antagonist; according to series creator Diego Molano, the fourth season would have "seen the entire town of gods rise up (including Huitzilopochtli) against Coyolxauqui and her Tzitzimimes [sic] in a cosmic scale war between light and dark with the earth hanging in the balance."
