= Aztec mythology =

Religious folklore of the Nahua peoples of the Triple Alliance (Aztec Empire)

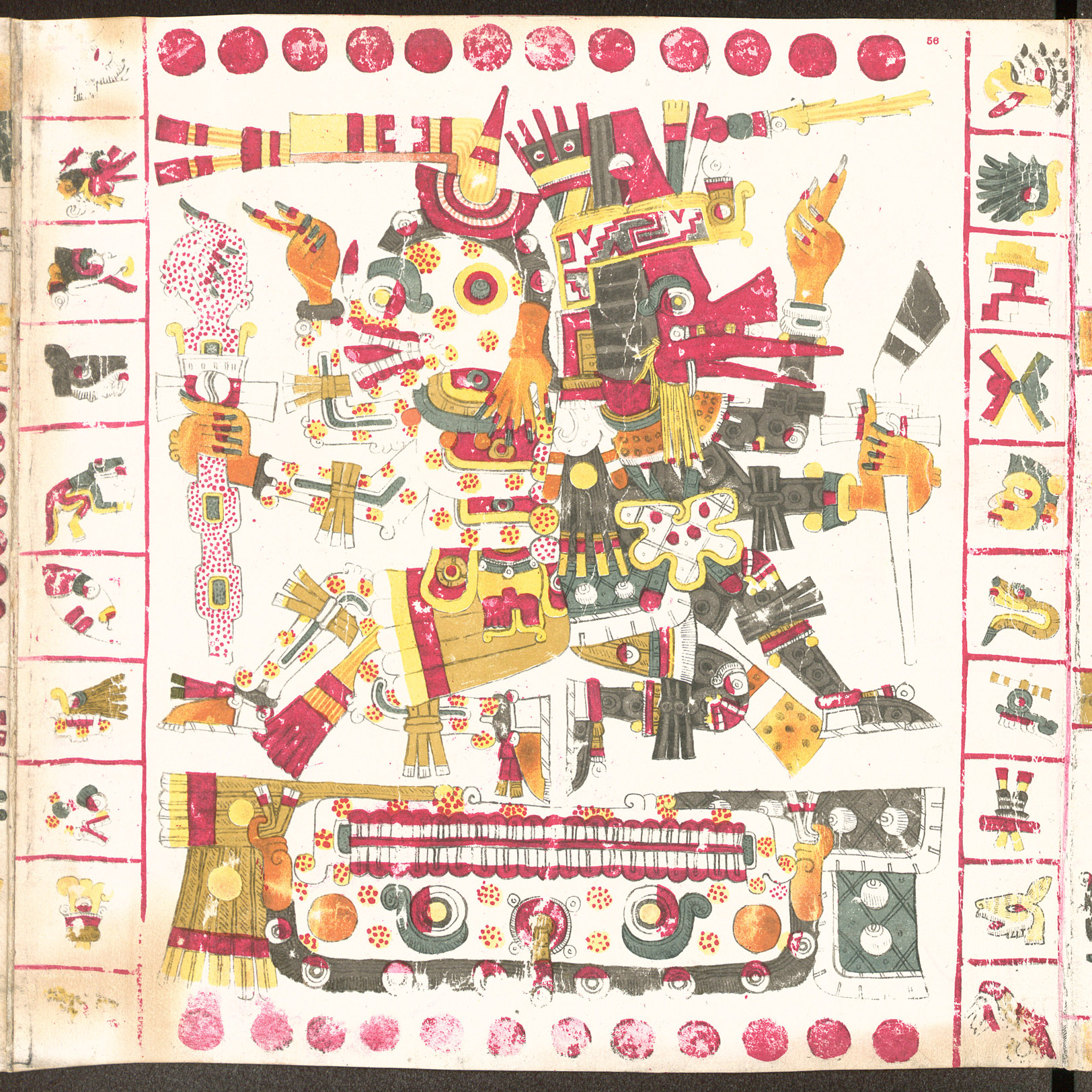
Mictlantecuhtli (left), god of death and the lord of the underworld, and Quetzalcoatl (right), god of wisdom, life, knowledge, the morning star, patron of the winds and light, and the lord of the West. Together they symbolize life and death.

Aztec mythology is the body or collection of myths of the Aztec civilization of Central Mexico. The Aztecs were a culture living in central Mexico and much of their mythology is similar to that of other Mesoamerican cultures. According to legend, the various groups who became the Aztecs arrived from the North into the Anahuac valley around Lake Texcoco. The location of this valley and lake of destination is clear – it is the heart of modern Mexico City – but little can be known with certainty about the origin of the Aztec. There are different accounts of their origin. In the myth, the ancestors of the Mexica/Aztec were one of seven groups that came from a place in the north called Aztlan, to make the journey southward, hence their name "Azteca." Other accounts cite their origin in Chicomoztoc, "the place of the seven caves", or at Tamoanchan (the legendary origin of all civilizations).

The Mexica/Aztec were said to be guided by their war-god Huitzilopochtli, to an island in Lake Texcoco, they saw an eagle, perched on a nopal cactus, holding a rattlesnake in its talons. This vision fulfilled a prophecy telling them that they should found their new home on that spot. The Aztecs built their city of Tenochtitlan on that site, building a great artificial island, which today is in the center of Mexico City. This legendary vision is pictured on the Coat of Arms of Mexico.

== Creation myth ==
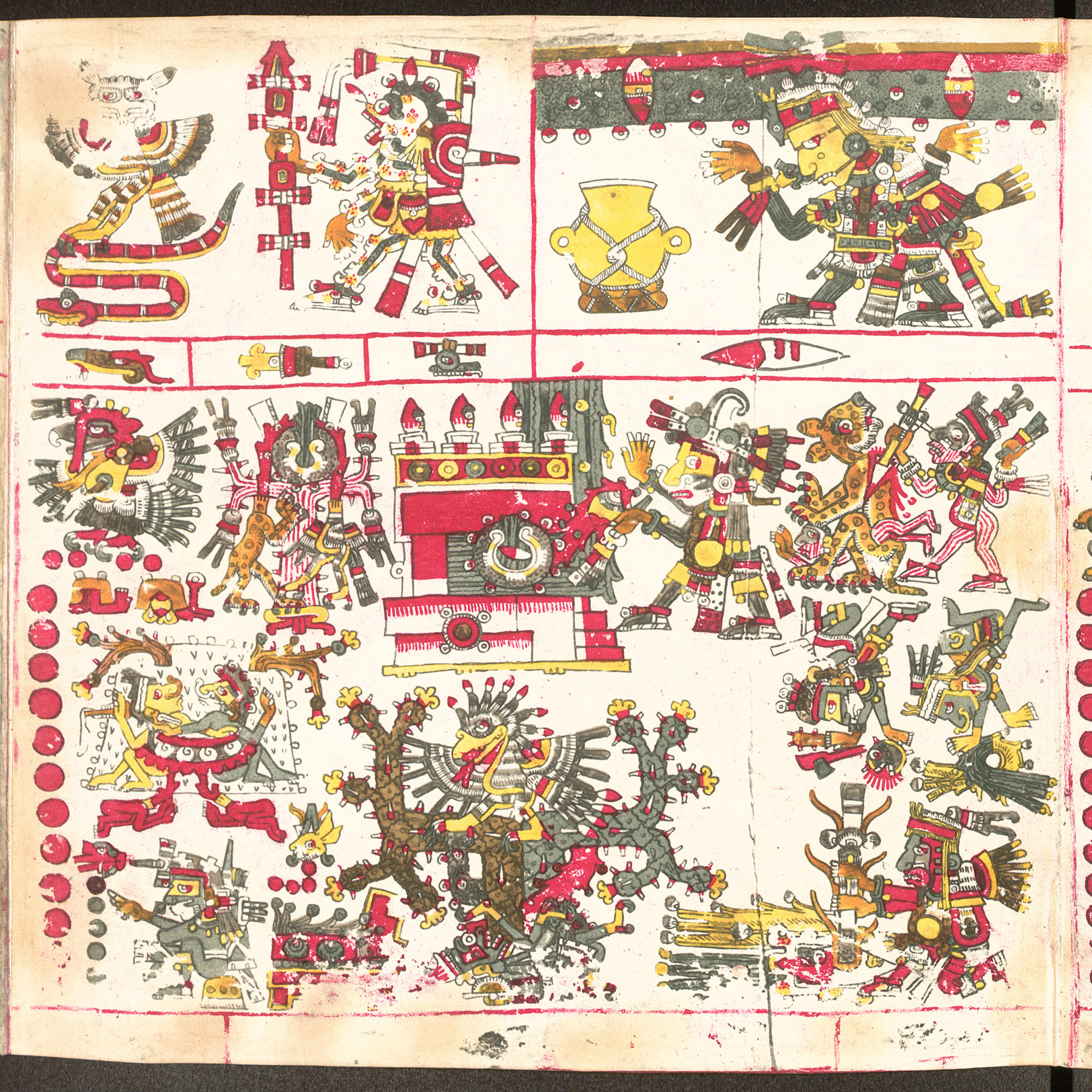
Huitzilopochtli is raising up the skies of the South, one of the four directions of the world, surrounded by their respective trees, temples, patterns, and divination symbols.

According to legend, when the Mexica arrived in the Anahuac valley around Lake Texcoco, they were considered by the other groups as the least civilized of all, but the Mexica decided to learn... and they took in all that they could from the other people, especially from the ancient Toltec (whom they seem to have partially confused with the more ancient civilization of Teotihuacan). To the Aztec, the Toltec were the originators of all culture; "Toltecayotl" was a synonym for culture. Aztec legends identify the Toltecs and the cult of Quetzalcoatl with the legendary city of Tollan, which they also identified with the more ancient Teotihuacan.

Because the Aztecs adopted and combined several traditions with their own earlier traditions, they had several creation myths. One of these, the Five Suns, describes four great ages preceding the present world, each of which ended in a catastrophe, and "were named in function of the force or divine element that violently put an end to each one of them". Coatlicue was the mother of Centzon Huitznahua ("Four Hundred Southerners"), her sons, and Coyolxauhqui, her daughter. At some point, she found a ball of feathers and placed it in her waistband, thus becoming pregnant with Huitzilopochtli. Her other children became suspicious as to the identity of the father, and vowed to kill their mother. She gave birth on Mount Coatepec, pursued by her children, but the newborn Huitzilopochtli (born fully armed and prepared to fight) defeated most of his brothers, who then became the stars. He also killed his half-sister, Coyolxauhqui, by tearing out her heart using Xiuhcoatl (a blue snake) and throwing her body down the mountain. This was said to inspire the Aztecs to rip the hearts out of their human sacrifices and throw their bodies down the sides of the temple dedicated to Huitzilopochtli, who represents the sun, chasing away the stars at dawn.

Our age (Nahui-Ollin), the fifth age, or fifth creation, began in the ancient city of Teotihuacan. According to the myth, all the gods had gathered to sacrifice themselves and create a new age. Although the world and the sun had already been created, it would only be through their sacrifice that the sun would be set into motion, and time and history could begin. The strongest and most handsome of the gods, Tecuciztecatl, was supposed to sacrifice himself but when it came time to self-immolate, he could not jump into the fire. Instead, Nanahuatl the smallest and humblest of the gods, who was also covered in boils, sacrificed himself first, and jumped into the flames. The sun was set into motion with his sacrifice, and time began. Humiliated by Nanahuatl's sacrifice, Tecuciztecatl, too, leaped into the fire and became the moon.

== Pantheon ==
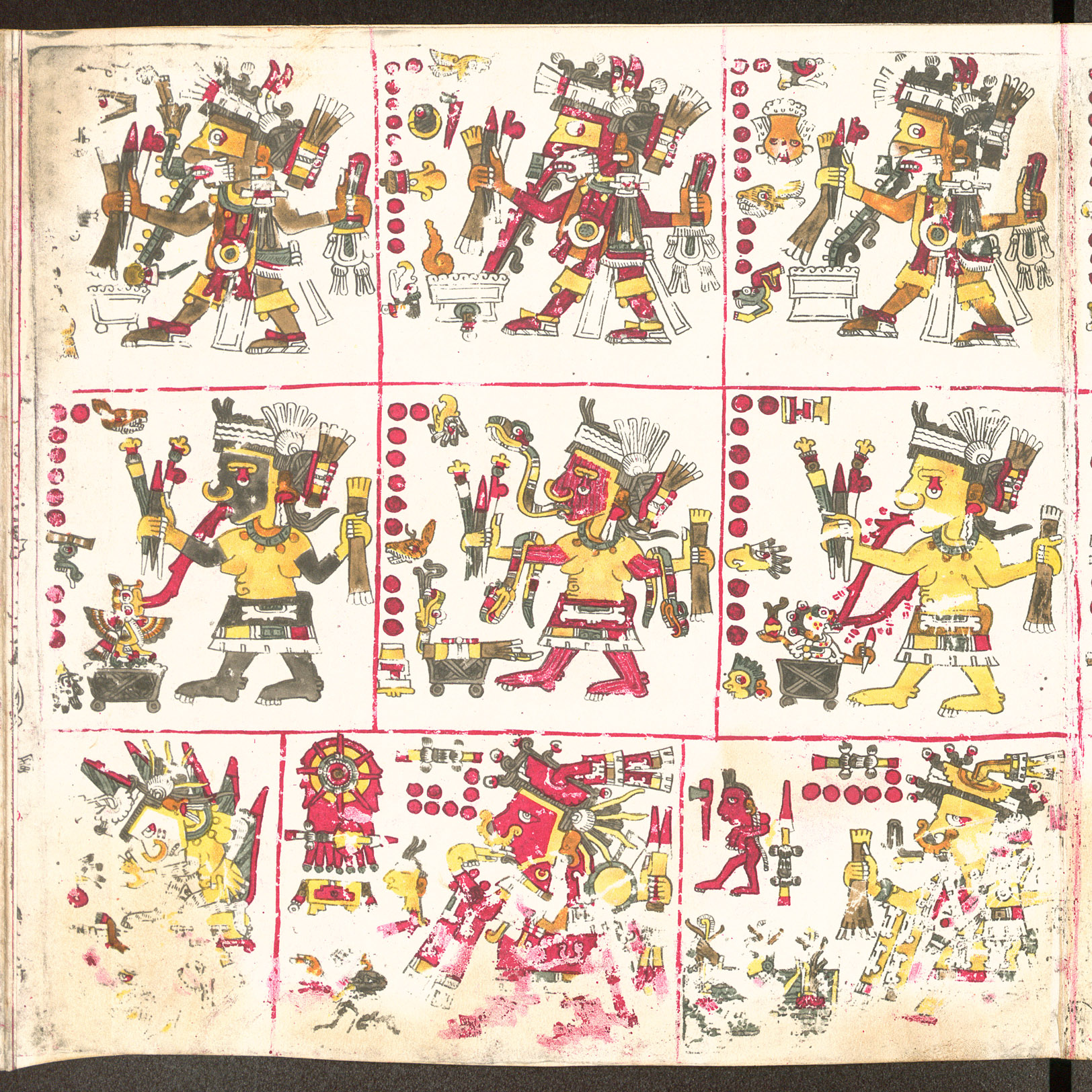
Embodied spirits; Tonalleque (1), Cihuateteo (2).

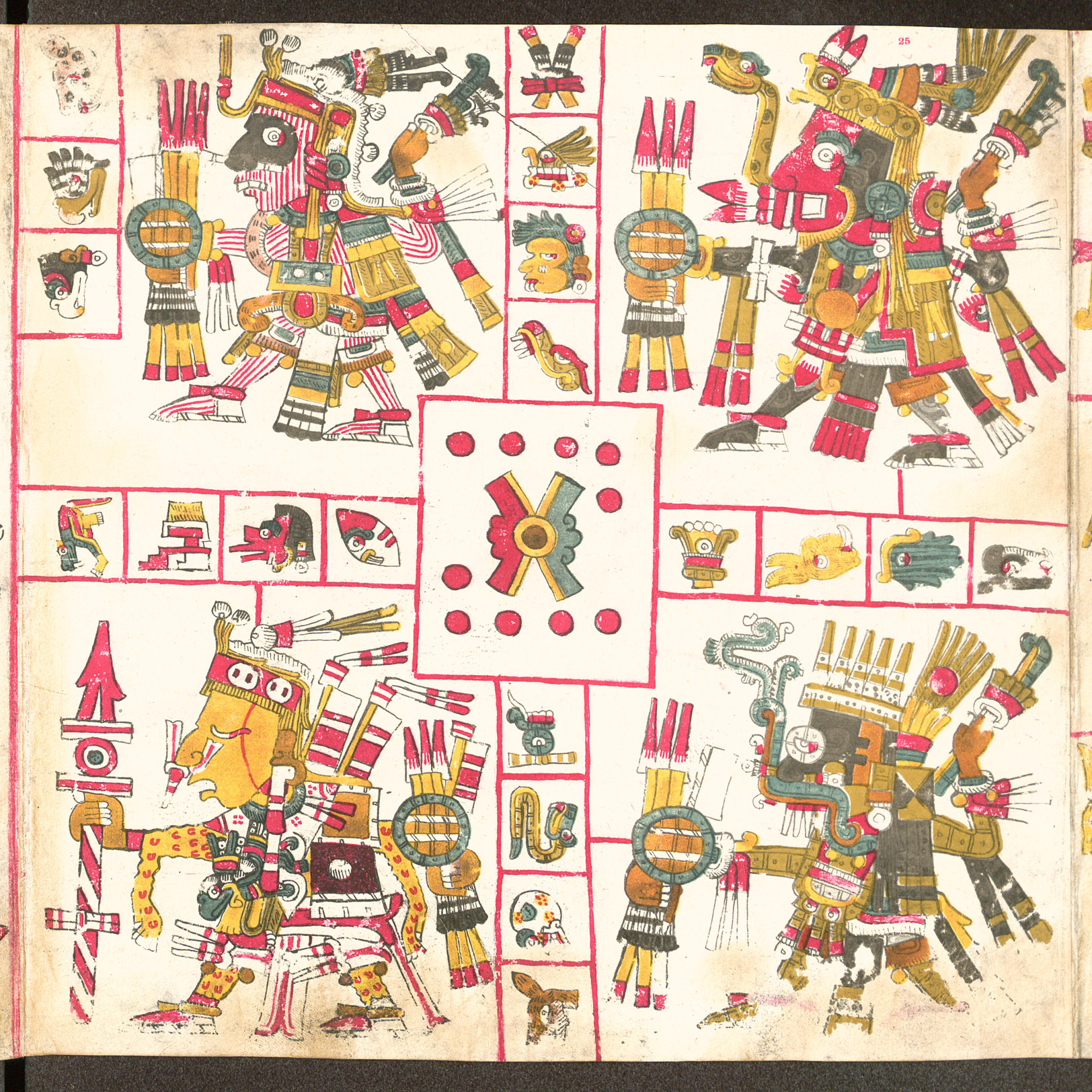
Patterns of War; (1a) Tlaloc, (1b) Xiuhtecuhtli, (2a) Mixcoatl, (2b) Xipe-Totec.

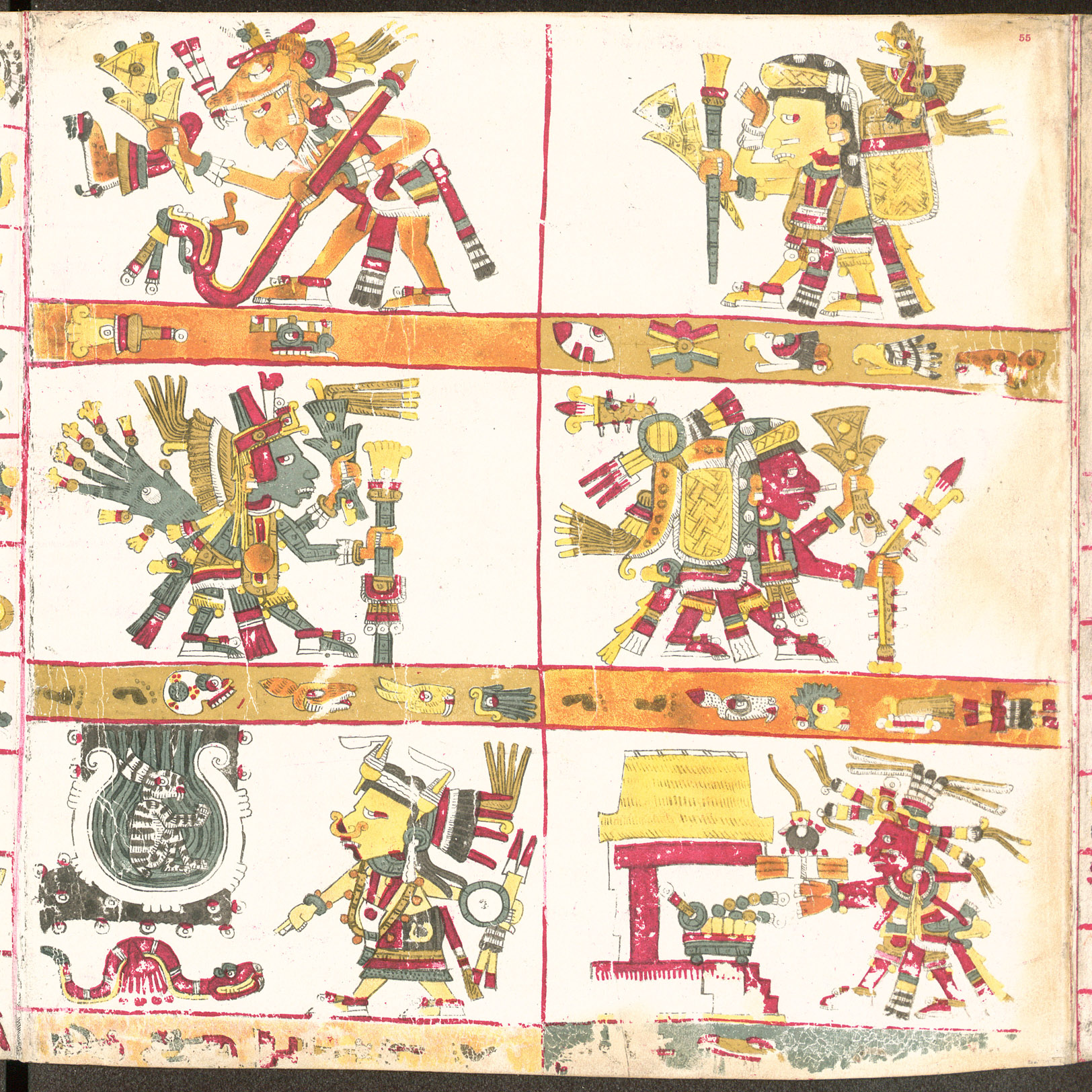
Patterns of Merchants; (1a) Huehuecoyotl, (1b) Zacatzontli, (2a) Yacatecuhtli, (2b) Tlacotzontli, (3a) Tlazolteotl and Metztli, (3b) Tonatiuh.

Since Aztec deities have several properties, scholars have difficulties identifying the image of each divinity.

In fact, the pictual construction of deities is based upon the combination of icons, each of which symbolizes meanings, rather than having one particular style of the deity. Despite having various ways to combine icons, each deity has a certain homogeneous meaning when observed entirely. Thus, analysis of elements of each deity helps identification of divine personalities. In addition, the elements of each devinity represent the content of the concept that the deity is responsible for.

- Water deities
  - Tlaloc, god of rain, lightning and thunder. He is a fertility god.
  - Chalchiuhtlicue, goddess of running water, lakes, rivers, seas, streams, horizontal waters, storms, and baptism.
  - Huixtocihuatl, goddess of salt
  - Opochtli, god of fishing and birdcatchers, discoverer of both the harpoon and net
  - Atlahua, god of water, a fisherman and archer
- Fire deities
  - Xiuhtecuhtli, god of fire and time
  - Chantico, goddess of the hearth (firebox) and volcanoes
  - Xolotl, god of fire, lightning, and death, associated with Venus as the Evening Star (Twin of Quetzalcoatl)
- Death deities
  - Mictlantecuhtli, god of the dead, ruler of the Underworld (Mictlan)
  - Mictecacihuatl, goddess of the dead, ruler of the Underworld (Mictlan)
  - Xolotl, god of lightning, death and deformity, associated with Venus as the Evening Star (Twin of Quetzalcoatl)
- Sky deities
  - Tezcatlipoca, god of providence, darkness, and the invisible, lord of the night, ruler of the North.
  - Xipe-Totec, god of force, lord of the seasons and rebirth, ruler of the East.
  - Quetzalcoatl, god of life, the light and wisdom, lord of the winds and daytime, ruler of the West.
  - Huitzilopochtli, god of war and sacrifice, lord of the sun and fire, ruler of the South.
  - Xolotl, god of lightning, death, and fire, associated with Venus as the Evening Star (Twin of Quetzalcoatl)
  - Ehecatl, god of wind (a form of Quetzalcoatl)
  - Tlaloc, god of rain, lightning and thunder. He is a fertility god.
  - Coyolxauhqui, goddess and leader of the Centzonhuitznahua, associated with the moon.
  - Meztli, goddess of the moon.
  - Tonatiuh, god of the sun.
  - Nanahuatzin, god of the sun. He sacrificed himself in a burning fire, so the god Tonatiuh took his place.
  - Centzon-mimixcoa, 400 gods of the northern stars
  - Centzon-huitznahua, 400 gods of the southern stars
  - Tlahuizcalpantecuhtli, god of the morning star (Venus)
- Lords of the Night
  - Xiuhtecuhtli, god of fire and time
  - Tezcatlipoca, god of providence, the darkness and the invisible, lord of the night, ruler of the North.
  - Piltzintecuhtli, god of visions, associated with Mercury (the planet that is visible just before sunrise, or just after sunset) and healing
  - Centeotl, god of maize
  - Mictlantecuhtli, god of the Underworld (Mictlan)
  - Chalchiuhtlicue, goddess of running water, lakes, rivers, seas, streams, horizontal waters, storms, and baptism.
  - Tlazolteotl, goddess of lust, carnality, and sexual misdeeds.
  - Tepeyollotl, god of the animals, darkened caves, echoes, and earthquakes. Tepeyollotl is a variant of Tezcatlipoca, whose name means "heart of the mountain"
  - Tlaloc, god of rain, lightning and thunder. He is a fertility god.
- Lords of the Day
  - Xiuhtecuhtli, god of fire and time
  - Tlaltecuhtli, the god/goddess of the earth (changed in the landscape and atmosphere)
  - Chalchiuhtlicue, goddess of running water, lakes, rivers, streams, the sea, horizontal waters, storms, and baptism.
  - Tonatiuh, god of the Sun
  - Tlazolteotl, goddess of lust, carnality, and sexual misdeeds.
  - Mictlantecuhtli, god of the Underworld (Mictlan)
  - Mictecacihuatl, goddess of the Underworld (Mictlan)
  - Centeotl, god of maize
  - Tlaloc, god of rain, lightning and thunder. He is a fertility god.
  - Quetzalcoatl, god of life, light and wisdom, lord of the winds and the day, ruler of the West.
  - Tezcatlipoca, god of providence, the darkness and the invisible, lord of the night, ruler of the North.
  - Tlahuizcalpantecuhtli, god of dawn (Venus)
  - Citlalicue, goddess of female stars in the Milky Way.
  - Citlalatonac, god of female stars (Husband of Citlalicue)
- Earth deities
  - Xipe-Totec, god of force, lord of the seasons and rebirth, ruler of the East.
  - Tonacatecuhtli, god of sustenance, associated with Ometecuhtli.
  - Tonacacihuatl, goddess of sustenance, associated with Omecihuatl.
  - Tlaltecuhtli, old god/goddess of earth (changed in the landscape and atmosphere)
  - Chicomecoatl, goddess of agriculture, whose name means "seven-serpent"
  - Centeotl, god of the maize associated with the Tianquiztli (Pleiades)
  - Xilonen, goddess of tender maize
- Matron goddesses
  - Coatlicue, goddess of fertility, life, death and rebirth
  - Chimalma, goddess of fertility, life, death and rebirth
  - Xochitlicue, goddess of fertility, life, death and rebirth
  - Itzpapalotl, warrior and death goddess, obsidian butterfly, leader of the Tzitzimimeh
  - Toci, goddess of health
- Star deities
  - Centzon-mimixcoa, 400 gods of the northern stars
  - Centzon-huitznahua, 400 gods of the southern stars
  - Citlalicue, goddess of female stars in the Milky Way.
  - Citlalatonac, god of female stars (Husband of Citlalicue)
  - Itzpapalotl, warrior and death goddess, obsidian butterfly, leader of the Tzitzimimeh
  - Mixcoatl, god of the hunt and "god of many tribes," identified with the Milky Way, the stars, and the heavens
  - Tlahuizcalpantecuhtli, god of the morning star (Venus)
  - Tzitzimimeh, monstrous deities associated with stars, often described as "demons"
  - Xolotl, god of death, associated with Venus as the Evening Star (Twin of Quetzalcoatl)

== See also ==
- Santa Muerte, the Mictecacihuatl reincarnate
- The Stinking Corpse
- Thirteen Heavens
- Mayan mythology

== Bibliography ==
- Primo Feliciano Velázquez (1975). Códice Chimalpopoca. Anales de Cuauhtitlán y Leyenda de los Soles (in Spanish). Instituto de Investigaciones Históricas. p. 161. ISBN 968-36-2747-1.
- Adela Fernández (1998). Dioses Prehispánicos de México (in Spanish). Panorama Editorial. p. 162. ISBN 968-38-0306-7.
- Cecilio Agustín Robelo (1905). Diccionario de Mitología Nahua (in Spanish). Biblioteca Porrúa. Imprenta del Museo Nacional de Arqueología, Historia y Etnología. p. 851. ISBN 978-968-432-795-5.
- Otilia Meza (1981). El Mundo Mágico de los Dioses del Anáhuac (in Spanish). Editorial Universo México. p. 153. ISBN 968-35-0093-5.
- Patricia Turner and Charles Russell Coulter (2001). Dictionary of Ancient Deities. Oxford University Press. p. 608. ISBN 0-19-514504-6.
- Michael Jordan (2004). Dictionary of Gods and Goddesses. Facts on File. p. 402. ISBN 0-8160-5923-3.
- Nowotny, Karl Anton (2005). Tlacuilolli: Style and Contents of the Mexican Pictorial Manuscripts with a Catalog of the Borgia Group. Norman: University of Oklahoma Press. p. 402. ISBN 978-0-8061-3653-0.
- François-Marie Bertrand (1881). Dictionnaire universel, historique et comparatif, de toutes les religions du monde: comprenant le judaisme, le christianisme, le paganisme, le sabéisme, le magisme, le druidisme, le brahmanisme, le bouddhismé, le chamisme, l'islamisme, le fétichisme (in French). Vol. 1, 2, 3, 4. Migne. p. 602.
- Douglas, David (2009). The Altlas of Lost Cults and mystery religions. Godsfield Press. pp. 34–35.
- Boone, Elizabeth H., ed. (1982). The Art and Iconography of Late Post-Classic Central Mexico. Washington, D.C.: Dumbarton Oaks. ISBN 0-88402-110-6.
- Boone, Elizabeth Hill (2013). Cycles of Time and Meaning in the Mexican Books of Fate. University of Texas Press. ISBN 978-0-292-75656-4.
- Brinton, Daniel G., ed. (1890). "Rig Veda Americanus". Library of Aboriginal American Literature. Vol. VIII. Project Gutenberg reproduction.(in English and Nahuatl languages)
- Leon-Portilla, Miguel (1990) [1963]. Aztec Thought and Culture. Translated by Davis, J.E. Norman, Oklahoma: Oklahoma University Press. ISBN 0-8061-2295-1.
- Miller, Mary; Karl Taube (1993). The Gods and Symbols of Ancient Mexico and the Maya. London: Thames and Hudson. ISBN 0-500-05068-6.
- James Lewis Thomas Chalmbers Spence, The Myths of Mexico and Peru: Aztec, Maya and Inca, 1913 The Myths of Mexico and Peru: Aztec, Maya and Inca
- Miguel León Portilla, Native Mesoamerican Spirituality, Paulist Press, 1980 Native Mesoamerican Spirituality: Ancient Myths, Discourses, Stories, Doctrines, Hymns, Poems from the Aztec, Yucatec, Quiche-Maya and Other Sacred Traditions
