= Ītzpāpālōtl =

Aztec goddess

Ītzpāpalōtl
- Ruler of Tamoanchan; Queen of the Tzitzimimeh; Goddess of War and Death
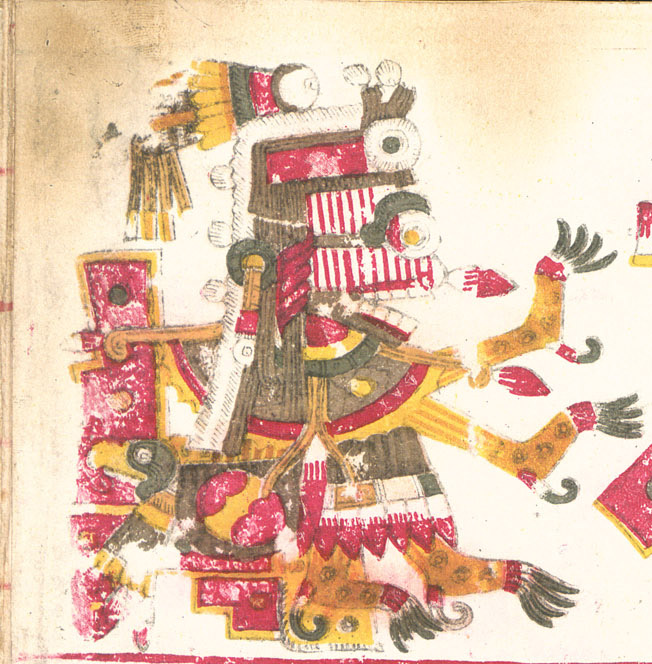
- Depiction of Itzpapalotl from the Codex Borgia
- Gender: Female
- Region: Mesoamerica
- Ethnic group: Aztec

Ītzpāpalōtl (Note: Nahuatl pronunciation: [iːt͡spaːˈpalot͡ɬ]) ("Obsidian Butterfly") was a goddess in Aztec religion.

She was a striking skeletal warrior and death goddess and the queen of the Tzitzimimeh. She ruled over the paradise world of Tamōhuānchān, the paradise of victims of infant mortality and the place identified as where humans were created.

She is the mother of Mixcoatl and is particularly associated with the moth Rothschildia orizaba from the family Saturniidae. Some of her associations are birds and fire. However, she primarily appears in the form of the Obsidian Butterfly.

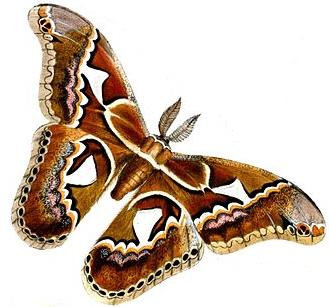
Rothschildia orizaba, the moth genus and species with which the Itzpapalotl goddess is associated

== Iconography ==
Itzpapalotl's name can either mean "obsidian butterfly" or "clawed butterfly;" the latter meaning seems most likely. It's quite possible that clawed butterfly refers to the bat and in some instances Itzpapalotl is depicted with bat wings. However, she can also appear with clear butterfly or eagle attributes. Her wings are obsidian or tecpatl (flint) knife tipped. (In the Manuscript of 1558, Itzpapalotl is described as having "blossomed into the white flint, and they took the white and wrapped it in a bundle.") She could appear in the form of a beautiful, seductive woman or terrible goddess with a skeletal head and butterfly wings supplied with stone blades. Although the identity remains inconclusive, the Zapotec deity named Goddess 2J by Alfonso Caso and Ignacio Bernal may be a Classic Zapotec form of Itzpapalotl. In many instances Goddess 2J, whose image is found on ceramic urns, is identified with bats. "In folklore, bats are sometimes called "black butterflies"". Itzpapalotl is sometimes represented as a goddess with flowing hair holding a trophy leg. The femur is thought by some scholars to have significance as a war trophy or a sacred object in Pre-Hispanic art.

== Ritual ==
Itzpapalotl is the patron of the day and associated with the stars Cozcuauhtli and Trecena 1 House in the Aztec calendar. The Trecena 1 House is one of the five western trecena dates dedicated to the cihuateteo, or women who had died in childbirth. Not only was Itzpapalotl considered one of the cihuateteo herself, but she was also one of the tzitzimime, star demons that threatened to devour people during solar eclipses.

One of the prominent aspects of the ritual surrounding Itzpapalotl relates to the creation story of the Chichimec. The ritual is illustrated in the sixteenth century document known as the Map of Cuauhtinchan No. 2. An illustration from this document shows Chichimec warriors emerging out of a seven-chambered cave behind Itzpapalotl. The deity is shown brandishing a severed leg, thought to be a symbol of battle. Beginning in the 1990s, archeologists exploring the Barranca Del Aguila region, southwest of Mexico City, have discovered caves carved to simulate the seven chambered cave, known as Chicomoztoc, from the ritual creation narrative.

== Mythology ==
According to the Manuscript of 1558, section VII, Itzpapalotl was one of two divine 2-headed doe-deers (the other one being Chimalman) who temporarily transformed themselves into women in order to seduce men. Itzpapalotl approached the two "cloud serpents named Xiuhnel [ˈʃiwnel] and Mimich [ˈmimit͡ʃ]", who transformed themselves into men (so as to disguise themselves when all the others of the Centzonmimixcoa had been slain in the ambush?). To Xiuhnel, Itzpapalotl said "Drink, Xiuhnel." Xiuhnel drank the blood and then immediately lay down with her. Suddenly she "... devoured him, tore open his breast. ... Then Mimich ... ran and ... descended into a thorny barrel cactus, fell into it, and the woman fell down after him." In the myth-history narrative of the Annales de Cuauhtitlan, the cloud deity victims take the form of deer, the hearts of whom are eaten by Itzpapalotl. The theme of the heart devouring goddess appears in other global mythologies.

== Influence on modern culture ==
- Orizaba the Moth Fairy, a villain in Elena of Avalor, was inspired by Itzpapalotl.
- The name of the goddess has been used to name formations, the Itzpapalotl Tessera, on the planet Venus which are being studied for our knowledge of the geological history of our planet.
- Additionally, the goddess is one of the Pre-Columbian motifs found in California Chicano Literature.
- Ītzpāpalōtl also features prominently in the novel Obsidian Butterfly, the ninth book in the Anita Blake: Vampire Hunter series by Laurell K. Hamilton.
- She was also the monster in No One Gets Out Alive, a movie on Netflix.
- She appears in Victor and Valentino in disguise based on the folklore.
- She appears in the American fantasy horror TV series, From Dusk till Dawn: The Series, under the guise as La Llorona.
- She will be the main antagonist in the upcoming Mexican-Brazilian-French animated film The Mark of the Jaguar.
- Citlali's Passive Skill "Itzpapalotl's Star Garments" named after this mythology in Genshin Impact.
- She features as part of an Aztec trinity in the religious revival which forms the subject of D.H.Lawrence's The Plumed Serpent
- The character Imani from Matt Dinniman's Dungeon Crawler Carl series chooses a race called "Obsidian Butterfly" giving her a skeletal appearance and butterfly wings inspired by Itzpapalotl.

== See also ==
- Cihuateteo
- Cihuacoatl
- Tzitzimime
- Mixcoatl
- Tamoanchan
- Huitzilopochtli
- Tlahuizcalpanteuctli
- Woman warrior
- List of women warriors in folklore

== Bibliography ==
- Miller, Mary; Taube, Karl (1993). The Gods and Symbols of Ancient Mexico and the Maya: An Illustrated Dictionary of Mesoamerican Religion. London: Thames & Hudson. ISBN 978-0-500-05068-2. OCLC 27667317.
- Read, Kay Almere; Jason J González (2002). Handbook of Mesoamerican Mythology: A Guide to the Gods, Heroes, Rituals, and Beliefs of Mexico and Central America. Oxford and New York: Oxford University Press. ISBN 978-0-19-514909-8. OCLC 77857686.
- Sahagún, Bernardino de (1997) [ca.1558–61]. Primeros Memoriales. Civilization of the American Indians series vol. 200, part 2. Thelma D. Sullivan (English trans. and paleography of Nahuatl text), with H.B. Nicholson, Arthur J.O. Anderson, Charles E. Dibble, Eloise Quiñones Keber, and Wayne Ruwet (completion, revisions, and ed.). Norman: University of Oklahoma Press. ISBN 978-0-8061-2909-9. OCLC 35848992.
- de Alva, J. Jorge Klor (1986). "California Chicano Literature and Pre-Columbian Motifs: Foil and Fetish". Confluencia. 1 (2): 18–26. JSTOR 27921652. ProQuest 1307994236.
- Gingerich, Willard (1988). "Three Nahuatl Hymns on the Mother Archetype: An Interpretive Commentary". Mexican Studies/Estudios Mexicanos. 4 (2): 191–244. doi:10.2307/1051822. JSTOR 1051822.
- Carrasco, Davíd; Sessions, Scott (2007). Cave, City, and Eagle's Nest: An Interpretive Journey Through the Mapa de Cuauhtinchan No. 2. UNM Press. ISBN 978-0-8263-4283-6.
