= Stinking Corpse =

Stinking corpse may refer to:

- The Stinking Corpse: Aztec myth about a giant which released a stench that would kill anyone who smelled it when he was killed by the Toltecs.
- Stinking Corpse Flower: Rafflesia, genus of parasitic flowering plants which includes the Stinking Corpse Lily (Rafflesia arnoldii)

== See also ==
- Amorphophallus titanum, also known as the corpse flower or corpse plant due to its stinking carcass smell.
