= Thelma D. Sullivan =

American linguist

Thelma Dorfman Sullivan (18 August 1918—11 August 1981) was an American paleographer, linguist and translator, regarded as one of the foremost scholars in the 20th century of the Classical Nahuatl language. Significant works include a compendium of Nahuatl grammar (1976), noted as the most comprehensive treatment of its day, and her translation of Bernardino de Sahagún's 16th-century text known as the Primeros Memoriales, completed by colleagues after her death.

== Life and education ==
Thelma Sullivan was born Pearl Thelma Dorfman to Rose Tannenbaum and Irving Dorfman in New York City in 1918. She attended Julia Richman High School, an all-girls school on the upper east side of Manhattan, and then went on to Hood College, where she majored in English literature. She did graduate work studying languages at the City College of New York and Johns Hopkins University. She married businessman Dennis Sullivan and they moved to Mexico City in 1948, where they lived until her death from cancer at age 62.

== Career ==
In New York City Sullivan worked as a professional writer in radio and theater. She continued to write after moving to Mexico City, contributing to the English language newspaper The News. While in Mexico City, Sullivan also worked as a Cultural Assistant to the U.S. Embassy. In this position she was asked to produce an English translation of the Bernardino de Sahagún's text Historia general de las cosas de Nueva España. Though she initially was working from Spanish to English, she soon also began studying Nahuatl under Padre Ángel María Garibay Kintana. She would eventually become a teacher of Classical Nahuatl at the Escuela Nacional de Antropología de México, though research and translation was her passion. Sullivan had great interest in the cultural history of Mexico, and she stressed that to be a good translator one had to understand the culture. Using her understanding of Aztec culture she sought to convey not just the meaning but the tone of the texts she translated. She wrote her compendium of Nahuatl grammar which was published in Spanish during her lifetime and in English after her death. In the decade before her death, she worked at both the Philological Research Institute of the National Autonomous University of Mexico (UNAM) and at the Centro de Investigaciones Superiores of the National Institute of Anthropology and History (INAH) working on publications centering around texts by Fray Andrés de Olmos and Sahagún. Her translations of Aztec poetry, mythology, prayers and proverbs was published posthumously as A Scattering of Jades: Stories, Poems, and Prayers of the Aztecs. A volume of British Archaeological Reports was published in her honor in 1988, Smoke and Mist: Mesoamerican Studies in Memory of Thelma D. Sullivan.
