= Atlahua =

Water deity

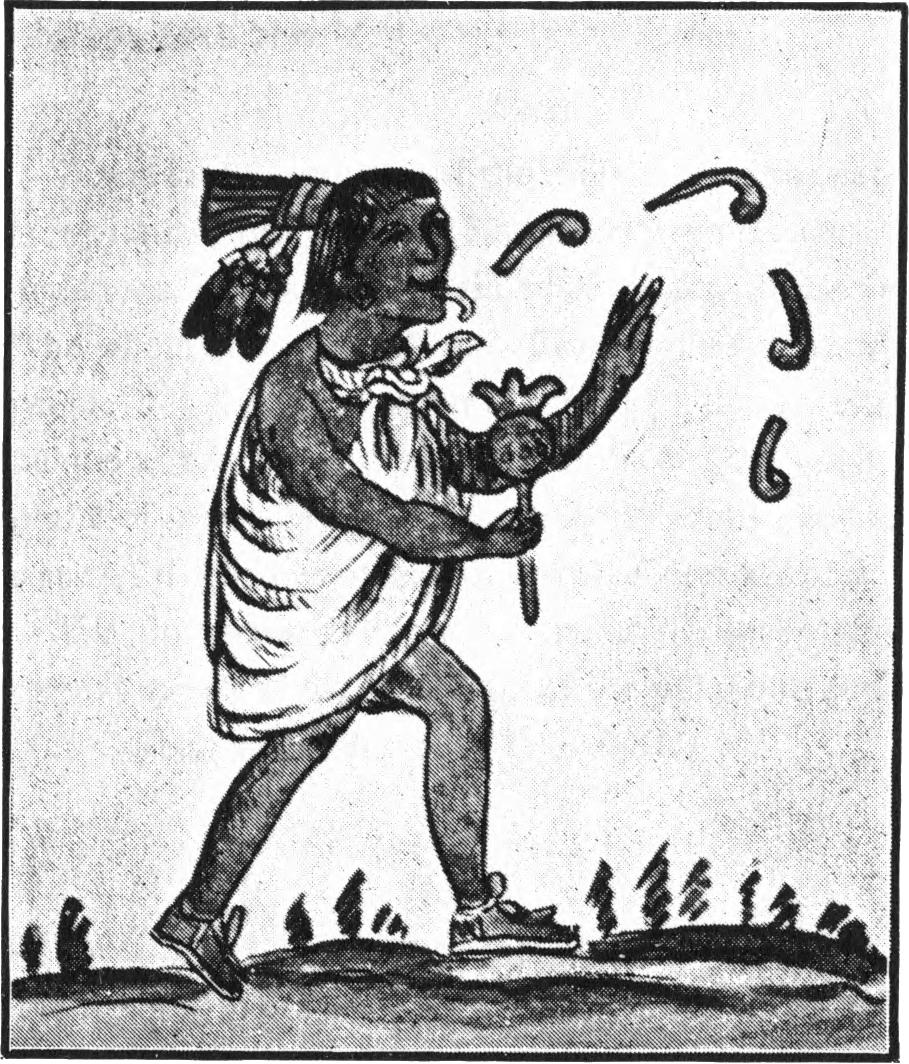
Aztec singing (shown with speech scrolls) and dancing presumably to Atlahua God, an illustration from Rig Veda Americanus, an 1890 book on American aboriginal literature

In Aztec mythology, Atlahua, Ahtlahua, Atlahoa, Atlavâ or Atlaua [aˈtɬawa] was a water God (the blue version of Tlaloc, the Tlaloc from the South), fisherman and archer. There were said to be at least four ancient Aztec temples at which he was worshiped, the tallest supposedly being over 200 feet tall (61 metres). The Aztecs prayed to him when there were deaths in water, such as when Hernando Cortez conquered Tenochtitlan (the Ancient Aztec capital on a lake, now Mexico City), and the lake was said to be "floating with heads and corpses".

The original image appears in General History of the Things of New Spain by Fray Bernardino de Sahagún: The Florentine Codex. Book II: The Ceremonies.
