= Tzitzimitl =

Female celestial deities

A Tzitzimītl (Note: Nahuatl pronunciation: [t͡siˈt͡simiːt͡ɬ]) (plural Tzitzimīmeh (Note: Nahuatl pronunciation: [t͡sit͡siˈmiːmeʔ])) is a type of celestial deity associated with stars in Aztec mythology. They were depicted as skeletal female figures wearing skirts often with skull and crossbones designs. In post-conquest descriptions they are often described as "demons" or "devils", but this does not necessarily reflect their function in the Cemanahuacan belief system of the Aztecs.

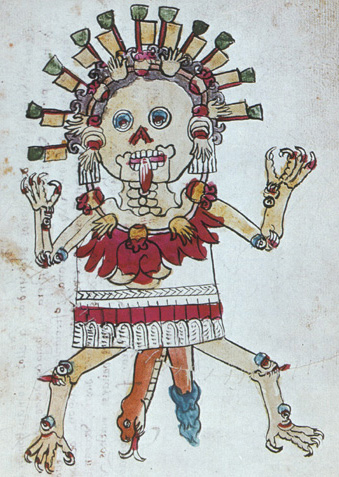
Depiction of a Tzitzimitl from the Codex Magliabechiano.

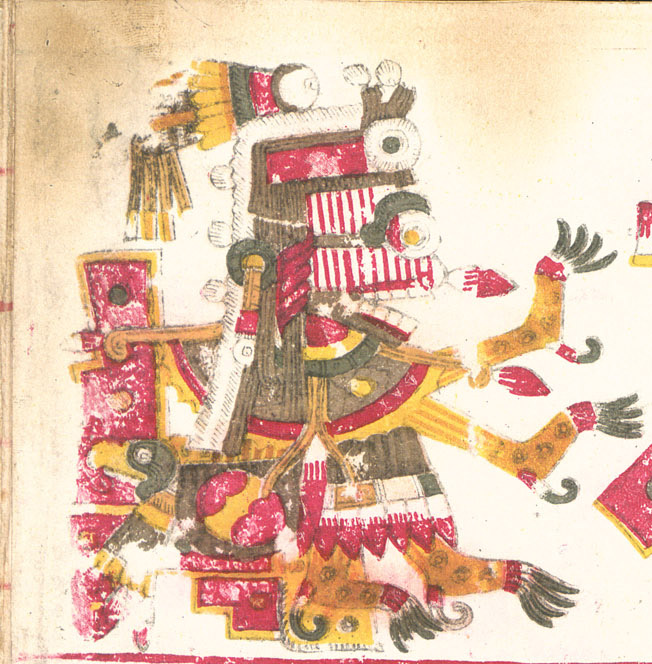
Depiction of Itzpapalotl, Queen of the Tzitzimimeh, from the Codex Borgia.

The Tzitzimimeh were female deities and related to fertility. They were associated with the Cihuateteo and other female deities such as Tlaltecuhtli, Cōātlīcue, Citlālicue and Cihuacōātl, and they were worshipped by midwives and parturient women. The leader of the tzitzimimeh was the goddess Itzpapalotl, who was the ruler of Tamoanchan, the paradise where the Tzitzimimeh resided.

The Tzitzimimeh were also associated with the stars and especially the stars that can be seen around the Sun during a solar eclipse. This was interpreted as the Tzitzimimeh attacking the Sun, thus causing the belief that during a solar eclipse, the tzitzimime would descend to the earth and possess men. It was said that if the Aztecs could not start a bow fire in the empty chest cavity of a sacrificed human at the end of a 52-year calendar round, the fifth sun would end and they would descend to devour the last of men. The Tzitzimimeh were also feared during other ominous periods of the Aztec world, such as during the five unlucky days called Nemontemi which marked an unstable period of the xiuhpōhualli (solar year count) and during the New Fire ceremony marking the beginning of a new calendar round; both were periods associated with the fear of change.

The Tzitzimimeh had a double role in Aztec religion: they were protectresses of the feminine and progenitresses of mankind. They were also powerful and dangerous, especially in periods of cosmic instability.

== In popular culture ==
- Tzitzimitl was one of 8 monsters from around the globe to appear as antagonists in the Be Cool, Scooby-Doo! episode titled "Mysteries On The Disorient Express."
- Tzitzimitl is depicted as a high-level demon in the roguelike game Dungeon Crawl Stone Soup.
- Tzitzimitl is also what the Warlady Skyy Appletini is referred to in the popular webcomic Erfworld.
- In the tabletop RPG Pathfinder, the Tzitzimitl are powerful undead creatures associated with outer space.
- Tzitzimitl are featured on the Cartoon Network series Victor and Valentino as recurring antagonists. In the episode "A New Don", they are depicted as tall black figures with multiple heads, a constellation style texture, and also have the ability to enter a person's body and control them with sunlight being their weakness. They reappear in "Starry Night" where they take over the bodies of Vic and Val's friends and try to glean information about their grandmother from them. In "Carmelita" it is revealed that they can also take over inanimate objects as one took over a car. They also appear to be in league with the series' main antagonist Tez. It is revealed in season 3's episode "Another Don" that prominent character Isabella has been Tzitzimitl in disguise since the beginning of the series.
- The tzitzimimeh are antagonists in Onyx Equinox, though they are associated with Mictecacihuatl. Though mostly highly aggressive and murderous, an allusion to their role in childbirth can be seen when they calm down the still infant goddess.
- Tzitzimilitl are demons that can be summoned by the player in numerous video games of the Megami Tensei franchise, including Shin Megami Tensei IV: Apocalypse, Persona 4 and its upgraded version Persona 4 Golden, and the PSP version of Persona 2: Innocent Sin. They are depicted in Kazuma Kaneko's artwork as red-robed female figures with countless arms sprouting from their skull, their many hands catching stars from the sky, while their bodies end at a distended belly containing the stars they have devoured. A single Tzitzimitl can be found in the first area of Shin Megami Tensei 5 with an subquest where she asks the protagonist to catch stars spread out in the area for her.
- Citlalin and Itzpapa in the gacha game Genshin Impact are Tzitzimitl heavily featured in the kit of the playable character Citlali, also known as Granny Itzli, a shaman of the Masters of the Night-Wind in the nation of Natlan in the game's primary world of Teyvat. The pair are described as having "inauspicious stars sealed within them" in dialogue from Citlali in the "Sunny Summer Fontinalia" event in version 6.7 of the game, and have the appearance of large, pillow-like plush figures with flipper-like arms, with Citlalin appearing to wear a scarf and Itzpapa appearing to have a lolling tongue.
- Tzitzimimeh are featured as mythological units in the real-time strategy game Age of Mythology: Retold, introduced in its Aztec-themed expansion named Obsidian Mirror.
