= Citlalatonac =

Aztec god who created the stars

Citlalatonac (Note: /ˌsɪtləˈtoʊnæk/) was a god in Aztec mythology.

He created the stars with his wife, Citlalicue. This pair of gods are sometimes associated with the first pair of humans, Nata and Nena.
