= Tamoanchan =

Mythical place

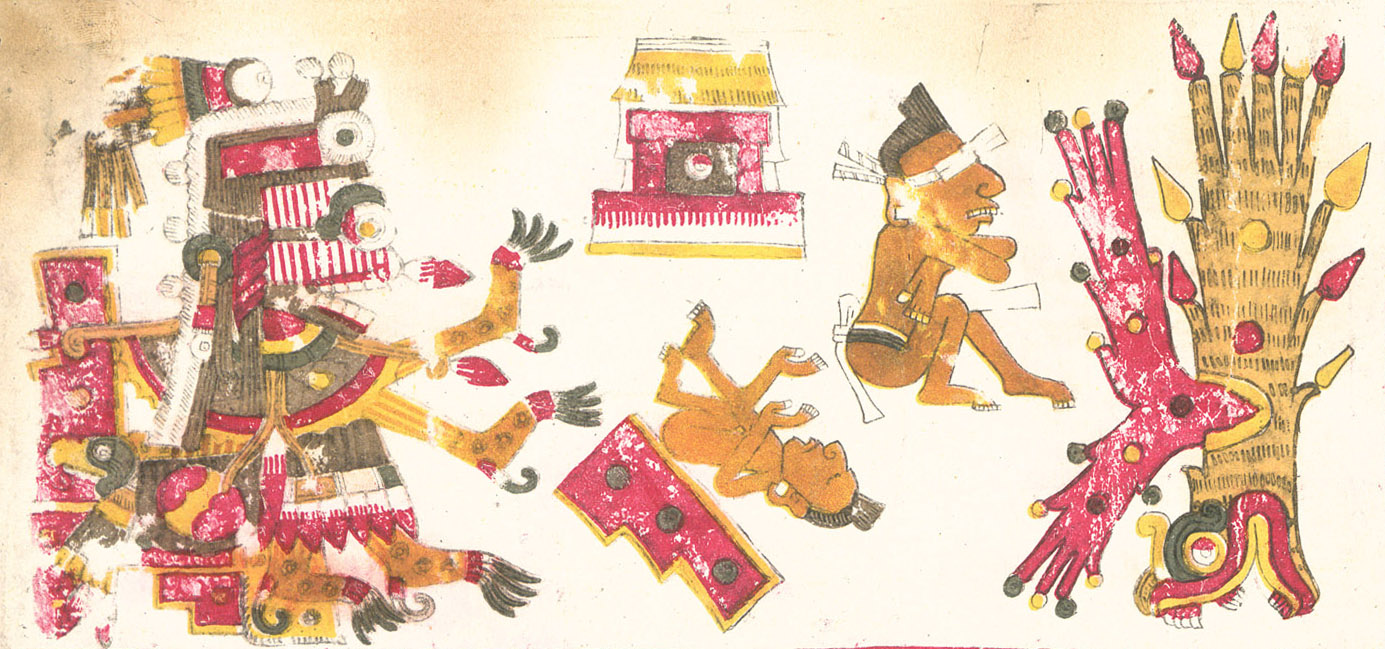
Itzpapalotl In Tamoanchan described in the Codex Borgia.

Tamōhuānchān [tamoːˈwaːn̥t͡ʃãː] is a mythical location of origin known to the Mesoamerican cultures of the central Mexican region in the Late Postclassic period. In the mythological traditions and creation accounts of Late Postclassic peoples such as the Aztec, Tamoanchan was conceived as a paradise where the gods created the first of the present human race out of sacrificed blood and ground human bones which had been stolen from the Underworld of Mictlan.

== Name ==
According to a figurative etymology in the Florentine Codex of Sahagún (bk. 10, ch. 29, para. 14), "Tamoanchan probably means "We go down to our home". The word tamoanchan does not actually come from the Nahuatl languages, but is instead demonstrated to have its roots in Mayan etymology, with a meaning which could be glossed as "place of the misty sky", or similar. Descriptions of Tamoanchan appearing in the Florentine Codex indicate that the Postclassic Nahuas thought of it being located in the humid lowlands region of the Gulf Coast of Mexico, inhabited by the Huastec Maya people.

== Depiction in codices ==
When depicted in Aztec codices Tamoanchan is frequently associated with the trecena 1 Calli in the Aztec calendar. This is "trecena 15 in the Borbonicus and Tonalamatl Aubin". The deity Itzpapalotl, one of the main tzitzimime figures ("star demons"), commonly presides over this trecena, and by extension Tamoanchan is often considered as part of her dominion.

The toponymic glyph used for Tamoanchan in the codices depicts a cleft tree, flowering and emitting blood; these motifs is the reference of the event when sexual transgression was committed in the paradise, causing the tree of life to be cut as described in the Codex Chimalpopoca. Besides being cleft, the two portions of the Tamoanchan-tree thus separated sometimes bear striping in opposite directions (as, in Codex Borgia 44) such that "their diagonal position ... indicates the internal helicoidal movement." Thus, helical rotations in two opposite directions would appear to be indicated.

== Historic, earthly location ==
Besides the mythical Tamoanchan, Mexican historian and scholar of Mesoamerican belief systems Alfredo López Austin identifies several sacred sites that were historical localities associated with Tamoanchan. According to López Austin the three Tamoanchans located on earth were:

1) the Tamoanchan in Cuauhnahuac;
2) Tamoanchan Chalchiuhmomozco mentioned by Chimalpahin Cuauhtlehuanitzin (... where Chalco Amaquemecan was later established); and
3) the Tamoanchan ... mentioned in Sahagún's work."

The first of these was where the first man and woman of the new re-peoplement were created (by Ehecatl), the "new Tamoanchan cave in the Province of Cuernavaca, actually Cuauhnahuac".

The second of these was "a fountain ... in which they saw a goddess and which they called chalchiuhmatlalatl ("blue-green waters of chalchihuite ...") on a small hill next to Iztactepetl and Popocatepetl. ... Tamoanchan Chalchiuhmomozco was so sacred that no one could defecate there. The settlers had to travel four leagues to relieve themselves at a place called Cuitlatepec, or Cuitlatetelco, but, since they were great magicians, they flew there." [Likewise for the Otomi, "Mayonikha is so sacred that no one can defecate" thereat.]

The third was the site where "the learned men, ... Tlaltecuin, and Xuchicahuaca, ... invented new sacred books, the count of destiny, the book of years, and the book of dreams."

== See also ==
- Francisco Plancarte y Navarrete
- Mythical place
- Aztlan
- Chicomoztoc
- Mesoamerican creation accounts
