= The Stinking Corpse =

Aztec myth

"The Stinking Corpse" is an Aztec myth that tells of the body of a giant, killed by the Toltecs, which released a stench that would kill anyone who smelled it. Versions of it are recorded in the Legend of the Suns (part of the Codex Chimalpopoca), the Anónimo Mexicano, Torquemada's Monarchia Indiana, and elsewhere.
