= Citlālicue =

Aztec goddess

Citlāllīcuē (Note: Nahuatl pronunciation: [s̻it͡ɬaːˈlːikʷeː]) ("star garment"), also Citlālinīcuē (Note: Nahuatl pronunciation: [s̻it͡ɬaːliˈniːkʷeː]) and Ilamātēcuhtli (Note: Nahuatl pronunciation: [ilamaːˈteːkʷt͡ɬi]), was a creator goddess in Aztec mythology.

She created the stars with her husband Citlalatonac, the Milky Way, Earth, death, and darkness. This pair of gods are sometimes associated with the first pair of humans, Nata and Nena.

In tōnalpōhualli, Citlālicue is the Liege of the Day for days that land on the 13th of the month (Nahuatl: mahtlactli-omei).

== See also ==
- Omecihuatl
