= Primeros Memoriales =

The Primeros Memoriales ("First Memoranda") is an illustrated Nahuatl-language manuscript compiled by the Franciscan missionary Bernardino de Sahagún and his indigenous assistants in Tepepulco as the first part of his project to document pre-Columbian Nahua society, known as the Historia General de las Cosas de Nueva España ("General History of the Things of New Spain").

The name Primeros Memoriales was given to the manuscript by the Mexican historian and archivist Francisco del Paso y Troncoso, when he reproduced the work as a facsimile edition in 1906.

== See also ==
- Florentine Codex
